Blueberry is a Western comic series created in the Franco-Belgian bandes dessinées (BD) tradition by the Belgian scriptwriter Jean-Michel Charlier and French comics artist Jean "Mœbius" Giraud. It chronicles the adventures of Mike Steve Donovan alias Blueberry on his travels through the American Old West. Blueberry is an atypical western hero; he is not a wandering lawman who brings evil-doers to justice, nor a handsome cowboy who "rides into town, saves the ranch, becomes the new sheriff and marries the schoolmarm". In any situation, he sees what he thinks needs doing, and he does it.

The series spawned out of the 1963 Fort Navajo comics series, originally intended as an ensemble narrative, but which quickly gravitated around the breakout character "Blueberry" as the main and central character after the first two stories, causing the series to continue under his name later on. The older stories, released under the Fort Navajo moniker, were ultimately reissued under the name Blueberry as well in later reprint runs. Two spin-off, or rather, sub-series, La Jeunesse de Blueberry (Young Blueberry) and Marshal Blueberry, were created pursuant the main series reaching its peak in popularity in the early 1980s.

It has been remarked that during the 1960s, Blueberry "was as much a staple in French comics as, say, The Avengers or The Flash here [in the USA]".

Synopsis
Born on 30 October 1843 on Redwood Plantation near Augusta, Georgia, Michael Steven Donovan is the son of a rich Southern planter and starts out life as a decided racist. On the brink of the American Civil War, Donovan is forced to flee north after being framed for the murder of his fiancée Harriet Tucker's father, a plantation owner. On his flight toward the Kentucky border, he is saved by Long Sam, a fugitive African-American slave from his father's estate, who paid with his life for his act of altruism. Inspired when he sees a blueberry bush, Donovan chooses the surname "Blueberry" as an alias when rescued from his Southern pursuers by a Union cavalry patrol (during his flight war had broken out between the States). After enlisting in the Union Army, he becomes an enemy of discrimination of all kinds, fighting against the Confederates (although being a Southerner himself, first enlisting as a bugler in order to avoid having to fire upon his former countrymen), later trying to protect the rights of Native Americans. He starts his adventures in the Far West as a lieutenant in the United States Cavalry shortly after the war. On his many travels in the West, Blueberry is frequently accompanied by his trusted companions, the hard-drinking deputy Jimmy McClure, and later also by "Red Neck" Wooley, a rugged pioneer and army scout.

Characters

Publication history
In his youth, Giraud had been a passionate fan of American Westerns and Blueberry has its roots in his earlier Western-themed works such as the Frank et Jeremie shorts, which were drawn for Far West magazine when he was only 18 – also having been his first sales as free-lancer – and the by Joseph "Jijé" Gillain heavily inspired Western short stories he created for the magazines from French publisher  (his first professional tenured employment as comic artist in the period 1956–1958), in particular the series of short Western comics featuring the same protagonist Art Howell which can be considered as Giraud's de facto first realistic Western series (and thus a precursor to Blueberry), as he himself did in effect, since he, save the first one, endowed these stories with the subtitle "Un aventure d'Art Howell". This was followed by his collaboration with Jijé himself on an episode of the latter's Jerry Spring series in 1960, which appeared in the Belgian comics magazine Spirou ("", issues 1192 – 1213, 1961), aside from his subsequent Western contributions to Benoit Gillian's (son of Jijé) short-lived comic magazine Bonux-Boy (1960/61). Directly before he started his apprenticeship at Jijé, Jean Giraud had already approached Jean-Michel Charlier on his own accord, asking him if he was interested in writing scripts for a new western series for publication in Pilote, the just by Charlier co-launched legendary French comic magazine. Charlier refused on that occasion, claiming he never felt much empathy for the genre. Biographer  though, has noted that Charlier, when he felt he was preaching to the choir, had the tendency to "take liberties" with actual events for dramatic effect. Charlier had in effect already written several Westerns, both comics and illustrated short prose stories, in the period 1949-1959 for various previous magazines. One such short entailed the text comic "Cochise" in Jeannot magazine, July 1957, dealing with the historical "Bascom Affair", which six years later would become the apotheosis of the first Blueberry story, "Fort Navajo". Furthermore, Charlier had already visited the South-West of the United States in 1960, resulting in several Native-American themed educational Pilote editorials.

In 1962, the magazine sent Charlier on a reporting assignment around the world for its editorials, and one of his last 1963 ports of call was Edwards Airforce Base in the Mojave Desert, California. He took the opportunity to (re-)discover the American West, returning to France with a strong urge to write a western. First he asked Jijé to draw the series, but Jijé, a lifelong friend and collaborator of Charlier, thought there would be a conflict of interest, since he was then a tenured artist at Spirou, a competing comic magazine, which published his own Western comic Jerry Spring, and in which he was very much invested. In his stead, Jijé proposed his protégé Giraud as the artist. A happy coincidence was that Giraud was also intimately familiar with the landscapes that had inspired Charlier, as he already had been on an extended stay of nine months in Mexico in 1956, where the endless blue skies and unending flat plains of Mexico's northern deserts had "cracked open his mind".

Original publications in French

note: English titles in parentheses where they exist and when first mentioned, original titles only where none are available
Blueberry was first published in the October 31, 1963 issue of Pilote magazine – hence Charlier's corresponding October 30 birth-date for his fictional character, when the magazine was printed and ready for dissemination. Initially titled "Fort Navajo", the story grew into 46 pages over the following issues. In this series Blueberry – whose physical appearance was inspired by French actor Jean-Paul Belmondo – was only one of many protagonists; the series was originally intended to be an assemble narrative, but quickly gravitated towards Blueberry as the central and primary character, even though the series' (sub-)title Fort Navajo, une Aventure du Lieutenant Blueberry was maintained for a decade by original publisher Dargaud for the numerous reprint, and international, runs, before the "Fort Navajo" (sub-)moniker was finally dropped in 1973 with the book publication of "L'homme qui valait 500 000 $" ("The Half-a-Million Dollar Man"). Charlier came up with the name during his American trip: "When I was traveling throughout the West, I was accompanied by a fellow journalist who was just in love with blueberry jam, so much in love, in fact, that I had nicknamed him 'Blueberry'. When I began to create the new series, and everything started to fall into place, I decided to reuse my friend's nickname, because I liked it and thought it was funny. [...] I had no idea that he would prove so popular that he would eventually take over the entire series, and later we would be stuck with that silly name!" In an anecdote, Charlier related how caught off guard he had been: "My memory is a somewhat like a sieve. In the first album, Blueberry was called Steve. I forgot that first name and then I named him Mike. So, in order to get things straight, I coined him Mike Steve Blueberry eventually; This kind of forgetfulness happens to me often".

Part of the Blueberry's breakout  popularity, had been his rebellious, anti-establishment character traits he had been intentionally and uncharacteristically endowed with by co-creator Charlier and very much the opposite of the other law abiding, squeaky clean comic heroes, Charlier had usually created up until then. This was however, in line with the prevailing mood of the counterculture of the 1960s, influences of which even the right-wing conservative Charlier could not escape entirely. It has enticed him to indulge in a little creative experimentation with the Blueberry character, having become somewhat bored and fed up with his own squeaky clean comic heroes, the military ones like Buck Danny in particular – Charlier usually reserved foibles for his secondary main characters to provide his creations with some levity and humanity, such as Blueberry's flawed friend Jimmy McClure. In stark contrast, one of the other intended major characters of the Fort Navajo series had been Blueberry's friend and colleague lieutenant Graig, who was very much a classic Charlier comics hero, law abiding, a stickler for rules and regulations, unquestioning in his blind obedience to, and acceptance of, authority, and so on. Charlier had apparently expected the presence of the Blueberry character in his creation to be of a transient nature, as he represented everything that Charlier personally opposed in private life, quite strongly so according to biographer Ratier.

Due to the fact that Blueberry became the most popular character so early on in the Fort Navajo story-arc, Charlier was forced to do an about-face and started to write out the other main characters, including lieutenant Graig, he had in place in order to make room for Blueberry. However, in one instance that had an unexpected side effect; when Charlier killed off the Native-American lieutenant Crowe in the fifth and last installment of the story-arc, "La piste des Navajos" ("Trail of the Navajo"), the editorial offices of Pilote received many angry letters from readers accusing Charlier of murdering a sympathetic protagonist. Taken aback, Charlier later stated: "It was too late to do anything about it, it was done. A strange experience, Giraud in particular took it very hard". Still, while all characters slated for prominence were written out, Blueberry excepted, one major, recurrent secondary character was written in over the course of the story arc in "Le cavalier perdu" ("Mission to Mexico"), Blueberry's friend and sidekick Jimmy McClure. Actually, and by his own admission, Charlier had originally written McClure as a temporary, minor background character, but Giraud was so taken with the character that he asked Charlier to expand his role in the series, and which stands out as the earliest known instance of Giraud exercising influence on the scripts of his senior colleague.

In post-war Europe, it has been tradition to release comics in "pre-publication" as serialized magazine episodes, before publication as a comic book, or rather comic album (in North-American understanding though, "graphic novel" is the more applicable terminology in this case, particularly where the physical properties of the book format are concerned, the distinction being a non-issue in native France), typically with a one to two year lag. Nonetheless, much of this material did find its way in later reprint variations, particularly in the editorials of the 2012 (trade) main series anthology collection – invariably called "integrals" in their respective languages in mainland Europe – of parent publisher Dargaud, and in those of their licensees such as Egmont for their earlier German/Danish/Norwegian 2006-2017 all-series integral edition collection

The first (French) Blueberry comic album, "Fort Navajo", was released in September 1965 and originally appeared as the 17th (and last) volume of the La Collection Pilote series. Actually, this collection had been an initiative of Charlier himself in his function as publishing co-editor, and the 17 titles in the collection were in effect Dargaud's first comic album releases, and an influential release at that. In order to give these releases a more "mature" image, the books were from the start executed as hard cover editions. Favorably received and though not being the first, the hard cover format became the norm in France definitively, where henceforth all comic albums were executed in the format – becoming indeed generally accepted as a mature part of French culture eventually – whereas the vast majority of the other European countries continued to employ the soft cover format for decades to come, somewhat reflecting the status comic books had in their societies at the time. These included for the time being French-Belgium as well, Charlier's native country, where the exact same collection was concurrently licensed to, and released by Le Lombard, albeit as soft cover only. Charlier's initiative was not entirely devoid of a healthy dose of self-interest, as over half the releases in the collection, were, aside from Blueberry, titles from other comic series he had co-created. After "Fort Navajo", the collection was suspended and each comic hero hitherto featured therein, spun off in book series of their own, including Blueberry or rather Fort Navajo, une Aventure du Lieutenant Blueberry as it was then still coined.

Other European countries followed the same template with local magazines. However, the format, for decades a staple in Europe and shaping entire generations of comic readers, went out of vogue in the late 1980s/early 1990s and the vast majority of European comic magazines have since then become defunct by the mid-1990s, including those from Belgium, the country were the phenomenon was born in the late 1930s. Ironically, while "Le bout de la piste" ("The End of the Trail") and "Arizona Love" became main series titles to see serialized pre-publication elsewhere, neither were serialized as such in France itself, where "La tribu fantôme" ("The Ghost Tribe") had previously become the last Blueberry title pre-published as such in L'Écho des savanes. Henceforth, new Blueberry titles were until 1997 directly released in album format, starting with the 1990 La Jeunesse de Blueberry (Young Blueberry) title, "Le raid infernal". Any subsequent French magazine, or newspaper serialized publication occurred after the initial book release while Blueberry was housed at Novedi and its successor, Swiss publisher , and which had actually already included "Angel Face" in Nouveau Tintin, and "La dernière carte" ("The Last Card") in Spirou previously, both having been serialized after their respective book releases.

After Charlier had died on 10 July 1989, Giraud, aside from completing "Arizona Love" on his own, wrote and drew five albums, from "Mister Blueberry" to "Dust" (constituting the OK Corral story arc), until his own death in 2012. Additionally, Giraud also scripted the intermezzo series Marshal Blueberry (1991-2000), but had no creative input for the La Jeunesse de Blueberry prequel series, after the first three, original volumes.

By the time Giraud embarked on the OK Corral cycle, publishing rights had returned to Dargaud, and that publisher decided to revitalize the magazine serialized pre-publication format as part of their marketing effort on behalf of Blueberrys return  (see below), albeit with a twist; As Dargaud no longer had a comic magazine of their own (Pilote had become defunct in 1989), it was decided to farm out pre-publication to parties who showed the most interest, resulting in that Blueberry titles in that cycle became serialized in different publications, not all necessarily comic-related by origin. The summer of 1997 saw the serialization of "Ombres sur Tombstone" in the French daily newspaper Le Monde, followed by the pre-publication of "Géronimo l’Apache" in the monthly  comic magazine, directly before the album release in October 1999 as part of Dargaud's substantial marketing campaign for the album. The next title, "OK Corral", was published in a similar manner in the summer of 2003 in the "L'ExpressMag" appendix of the non-comic weekly news magazine L'Express.

The mere fact that serious newspapers and magazines were by then vying for the opportunity to run Blueberry in their publications first (aside from the above-mentioned publications, the newspaper France-Soir had already run the first two outings of the revitalized La Jeunesse de Blueberry series in 1985 and 1987 – see below), was testament to the status Blueberry and its creator(s) had by then attained in Francophone Europe.

Royalties conflict (1974–1979)

With the growing popularity of Blueberry came the increasing disenchantment over financial remunerations of the series. Already in 1974, Charlier made his displeasure known in this regard, when he had "Angel Face" pre-published in Nouveau Tintin of industry competitor Le Lombard, the first time a Blueberry adventure was not serialized in Pilote – nor would it ever be again in hindsight. The magazine was forced to drop the announcement page it had prepared for the story. Unfazed, Dargaud founder and owner Georges Dargaud, unwilling to give in, countered by having the book released before Nouveau Tintin had even had the chance to run the story. Then Giraud left on his own accord. While Charlier had no influence on this whatsoever, it did serve a purpose as far as he was concerned. Giraud had left Blueberry on a cliff-hanger with "Angel Face", resulting in an insatiable demand for more, putting the pressure on Dargaud. Whenever Georges Dargaud asked Charlier for a next Blueberry adventure, repeatedly, Charlier was now able to respond that he was "devoid of inspiration".

As a matter of fact, Giraud was dying to leave Pilote and Blueberry, partly because he was tired of the stifling publication pressure he was under in order to produce the series, partly because of the royalties conflict, but mostly because he wanted to further explore and develop his "Mœbius" alter ego. For Giraud the conflict was actually a godsend: "At that moment Charlier and I also had a financial conflict with Dargaud which came at the exact right time, because it provided me with an alibi [to leave]". The latter reason for him to leave, took on an urgency after Alejandro Jodorowsky, impressed by his Blueberry art, had already invited Giraud to come over to Los Angeles to work as concept designer and storyboard artist on his Dune movie project earlier that year, constituting the first Jodorowsky/Mœbius collaboration. Very eager to return to Los Angeles as Jodorowsky requested his presence again, Giraud – who had returned to France for his other work during one of the lulls in the Dune production – greatly accelerated his work on "Angel Face", then underway, breaking his "absolute record speed-drawing", as he had coined it, and sheared off weeks from its originally intended completion date. Giraud in overdrive was so fast that he even overtook Charlier's script pages (Charlier habitually fed his artists piecemeal with script pages, usually a couple at the time), forcing him to write ten pages of the story on his own, as Charlier was at that time on documentary assignment in the United States for French television. Upon his return, Charlier took one look at the pages completed in his absence, and continued where Giraud had left off without further much ado. Charlier himself had actually already left Dargaud in 1972, because he additionally felt ill at ease with the editorial modernization of Pilote, which resulted from the 1968 revolt at the editorial offices staged by key artists, chief among them Giraud (see also: "Giraud on his part in the uprising at Pilote"). Though Charlier continued to provide his younger colleague with scripts (but not his other artists), he started working as documentary maker for French television. It was while he was working on two documentaries on the Mexican Revolution that he gained inspiration for his below-mentioned Les Gringos Western comic series, which started its run in 1979 at Koralle.

It was the first time that Giraud wrote for Blueberry by himself, and was, considering Charlier's easy acceptance of Giraud's writing, also testament to the close, and trusting working relationship both men had cultivated by that time. Incidentally, Giraud intimated that the deteriorating circumstances at Pilote had already left its mark on him before he left: "The story was started in 1972/73 but remained shelved until 1975 [sic.]. Yet, I think one can not discern its difficult birth; there are good scenes, pages I really poured heart and soul into. It is true that [the art for] "Le hors-la-loi" ("The Outlaw") had been quite weak, but "Angel Face" made up for it".

Five years later, Giraud was ready to return to Blueberry, at long last feeling the urge again to do so, but not into the employ of Pilote/Dargaud, as he had formally terminated his position in 1974 with no intention whatsoever to return, instead plying his Blueberry trade as a freelancer: "Publishers were waving with those fat checks, so we started again. But it is no longer the same. I won't be taken in by Blueberry anymore!", referring to the first half of the 1970s when he felt smothered by his co-creation. Yet, the whole business surrounding Blueberry residuals itself remained unresolved, and in order to drive home the point the pe-publication of the eagerly awaited "Nez Cassé" ("Broken Nose") story was farmed out to Métal Hurlant magazine (published by Les Humanoïdes Associés, co-founded by Giraud in 1974, and in the US released as Heavy Metal in the mid-1970s, though the story was not run in the American version), instead of Pilote. That Charlier was able to repeat this ploy after "Angel Face" stemmed from the proviso he had built in when he signed over the publication, and copyrights of his syndication agency EdiFrance/EdiPresse – co-established in 1955 with Victor Hubinon, Albert Uderzo, and René Goscinny for the express purpose to syndicate their own and other artist's comic creations – to Dargaud in 1960. On that occasion Charlier, owning a law degree, stipulated an exemption clause for magazine (pre-)publications of his own (co-)creations. Though never intended as such, the hitherto dormant exemption clause now served him well in his conflict with Dargaud, without having to fear for any legal ramifications on Dargaud's part. Yet, Georges Dargaud refused to take the bait and the creators subsequently put forward the Jim Cutlass western comic as a last ditch effort to spell out to Dargaud that the creators had other options. Dargaud still would not budge. It was then that it became clear to Charlier, that he was left with no other option than to leave, and this he did taking all his other co-creations with him, to wit Redbeard and Tanguy et Laverdure, which, while not as popular as Blueberry, were steady money making properties for Dargaud nonetheless.

Blueberry's publishing wanderings (1979–1990)
Though they were still contractually obligated to leave their most recent Blueberry title, "Nez Cassé", at Dargaud for book publication, Charlier and Giraud then threw in their lot with German publisher Koralle-Verlag – incidentally the first German language Blueberry book publisher back in the early 1970s – a subsidiary at the time of German media giant Axel Springer SE, for their next publication, "La longue marche" ("The Long March"). The choice for the German publisher was made for their very ambitious international expansion strategy they had in place at that time. Fully subscribing to the publisher's strategy, Charlier not only revitalized his Redbeard and Tanguy et Laverdure comic series – having been equally "devoid of inspiration" for these as well in the 1974-1979 Pilote-era because of the royalties issue – but created the new Western comic, Les Gringos (art by Victor de la Fuente), as well. Yet, for all Charlier's business acumen, he had failed to recognize that Koralle's exuberant expansion drive had essentially been a do-or-die effort on their part. In 1978 Koralle was on the verge of bankruptcy, and a scheme was devised to stave off this fate; international expansion. In the European comics world that was a rather novel idea at the time and Koralle did expand beyond the German border into large parts of Europe with variants of their main publication Zack magazine, with the revived Blueberry as its flagship, accompanied with comic book releases. It did not pay off however, as the holding company already pulled the plug in 1980, leaving Blueberry and the others quite unexpectedly without a publishing home.

It were not only the Blueberry creators that were left in a pickle, as Koralle had managed to convince other well known Franco-Belgian comic artists to switch sides. Aside from Giraud's old mentor Jijé (who, having abandoned his own Jerry Spring Western comic, was now penciling Charlier's revitalized Redbeard and Tanguy et Laverdure), these predominantly concerned artists from publishing house Le Lombard. The most prominent of the latter was Hermann Huppen with his new post-apocalyptic Western Jeremiah for which he had abandoned that other famed 1970s Franco-Belgian Western,  (written by Greg), second only in renown after Blueberry at the time. Tapping into his substantial social Franco-Belgian comic network, Charlier found Jacques de Kezel – a highly influential behind-the-scenes figure of the Belgian comics world at those times, and who had actually gathered the stable of artists for Koralle – willing for Axel Springer to pass the torch to. As a token of goodwill, a relieved Springer, as they now could turn over the current contractual obligations without much further ado, even allowed the French-language version of Zack, Super As, to run for a few issues longer in order to allow as many series as possible to complete their magazine run, which included "La longue marche". De Kezel's new publishing house "Les Nouvelles Editions Internationales S.A." (Novedi) was established in November 1980 with its seat in Brussels, Belgium. Part of their strategy was to forego on a magazine of their own and instead release titles directly in album format, as it was noticed that the serialized comic magazine format had already started to wane in Europe as a format (and actually one of the main reasons for Axel Springer to pull the plug on Koralle), resulting in the advantage of not having to incur the expenses of maintaining magazine editorial offices. Any still existing comic magazine elsewhere, willing to publish serialized comic series after the initial book releases, was merely considered an added bonus.

Still, it took some time for the new publisher to get up and running, and some sort of stop-gap resolution had to be found for the intervening 1979-1980 period in order to secure income for the stable of comic artists. On recommendation of Charlier, who has had previous dealings with the publisher, the catalog was legally, but temporarily, housed at the French publishing house  of the Hachette group, who for the occasion established the equally temporary EDI-3-BD imprint, though making use of Koralle's infrastructure – allowed to continue to exist for the time being by Axel Springer – in regard to printing and distribution. As impromptu publisher, EDI-3-BD published around two dozen album titles, including "La longue marche", before turning the copyrights of these over to Novedi, which started publishing themselves in 1981. EDI-3-BD published their books for Belgium and the Netherlands themselves, but farmed out licenses for other countries, including France somewhat surprisingly, where Giraud's former alma mater and Hachette competitor Fleurus firstly became the album publisher for "La longue marche". After Novedi had become operational, the business model was adopted by them and it was decided to continue with Giraud's other alma mater Hachette for France with the subsequent titles in the Blueberry (and other) series in recognition of the help Édi-Monde had provided. Hachette incidentally, later acquired a special, one-time-only license from Dargaud to reissue the entirety of the Blueberry series in 2013-2014 as the 52 volume La Collection Blueberry anthology, each volume augmented with a six-page illustrated editorial.

For a decade Blueberry resided in calm waters at Novedi. The 1980s saw three additions to the main series (completing the Rehabilitation story arc) as well as four new titles in the newly created La Jeunesse de Blueberry series. Nevertheless, despite the two Blueberry incarnations and Jeremiah being the top selling series for the publisher, it appeared that the financial base was too narrow for even a publisher the modest size of Novedi, as the publisher went out of business in 1990, after having published approximately 120 album titles, and despite having taken over the book publications for France themselves as well in the latter half of the decade. It again left Blueberry and the others without a publishing home.

Death of a creator (1989)

On 10 July 1989, Jean-Michel Charlier passed away from a heart condition after a short illness. By all accounts Charlier had been a workaholic throughout his career, working simultaneously on as much as a dozen projects at any given time, steadily increasing his workload as he grew older. His heart condition had already troubled him in his later years and his death, while sudden, was not entirely a surprise. Charlier's penchant for hard work increasingly became a concern for Giraud when he visited his longtime co-worker six months before his death: "He was a work bulimic! There were always seven to eight scenarios underway. His life was a true path of self-destruction. You should have seen him working at his desk! Six months before his passing, I advised him to slow down. Very artistically, he replied: No, I have chosen this!"

Charlier, having been of a previous generation, conservative in nature and wary of science fiction in general, had never understood what his younger colleague tried to achieve as "Mœbius". Nonetheless, he never tried to hinder Giraud in the least, as he understood that an artist of Giraud's caliber needed a "mental shower" from time to time. Furthermore, Charlier was very appreciative of the graphic innovations Giraud ported over from his work as "Mœbius" into the mainstream Blueberry series, most specifically "Nez Cassé", making him "one of the all-time greatest artists in the comic medium", as Charlier himself worded it in 1982. Artist , who was taken on by Giraud in 1980 for the inks of "La longue marche" ("The Long March") painted a slightly different picture though. Already recognizing that the two men were living in different worlds, he noted that Charlier was not pleased with Giraud taking on an assistant, afraid that it might have been a prelude to him leaving the series in order to pursue his "experimentations" as Mœbius further. Even Giraud was in later life led to believe that Charlier apparently "detested" his other work, looking upon it as something akin to "treason", though his personal experiences with the author was that he had kept an "open mind" in this regard, at least in his case. While Charlier was willing to overlook Giraud's wanderings in his case only, he was otherwise of the firm conviction that artists, especially his own, should totally and wholeheartedly devote themselves to their craft – as Charlier always had considered the comic medium – but which was somewhat incongruous on his part as he himself was habitually engaged in several divergent projects at any given time. This has caused many of his artists problems on a frequent basis, as he was consistently and notoriously late with his piecemeal provided script pages, including Giraud at the start of his Blueberry career. However, as he recognized quite early on that Blueberry occupied a special place in his body of work, he later made sure that (only) his Blueberry artists were provided with scripts in a timely fashion. Charlier's method of working came at a cost, as his scripts frequently contained continuity errors on the detail level, and which included those of Blueberry, such as in his above cited instance of his hero's first name. Charlier has cited the Blueberry titles "La mine de l'allemand perdu" ("The Lost Dutchman's Mine") through "L'homme qui valait 500 000 $" ("The Half-a-Million Dollar Man") as his favorites for their "potency", both story and artwise, the latter making him the co-winner of his 1973 American comic award.

The script being one-thirds ready at the time of Charlier's passing, the completion of "Arizona Love" was postponed as Giraud needed time to come to terms with that fact. Due to his intimate twenty-five year familiarity with both the series and its writer, it was a foregone conclusion that Giraud would from then on take on the scripting of the main series as well, especially since it was already agreed upon in the "contracts signed with Jean-Michel" that "the survivor would take over the series". It was this circumstance that has led Philippe Charlier, son of the deceased author and now the heir and steward of his father's bande dessinée legacy, to make the unsubstantiated claim that Novedi was surreptitiously negotiating with Giraud only for the existing and future Blueberry series, intent on cutting the Charlier family out, which was incongruous as Novedi was already heading toward receivership, aside from the fact that Giraud has never even hinted at such alleged dealings and that not a single corroborating rumor has ever surfaced elsewhere in the otherwise tight-knit Franco-Belgian comic community, save for the claim Charlier Jr. himself made on that sole occasion in the comic journal BoDoï (issue 24, 1999). Furthermore, per French law, Charlier's widow Christine remained entitled to 10 percent of the revenues from the existing and subsequent post-Charlier Blueberry titles, which provided her with a "decent" living standard, according to son Philippe, effectively contradicting his own claim on the very same occasion. As for Giraud, having to work without a safety net for the first time, came initially with bouts of self-doubt and second-guessing, as Colin Wilson (by then the new La Jeunesse de Blueberry artist) testified to, after a visit to Giraud in this period: " and I visited Jean when he was working on "Arizona Love" – around May 1989 [sic.] I think. Some of the first pages he showed us then were radically different from the ones ultimately published in the album later on. I did not had the time to read the scripts for those pages he had shown us, but I know that Jean redid several pages entirely anew, before the album was eventually released". The by Giraud rejected pages were published as a bonus in the 1995 deluxe limited edition of "Mister Blueberry", a joint publication of Dargaud and Giraud's publishing house Stardom.

Stunned by the sudden death of his longtime co-worker, it took Giraud nearly five years before he could bring himself to embark on Blueberry again as artist, after completing "Arizona Love". Giraud stated that the series had lost its "father", and that the "mother needed time to mourn".

Continued publishing wanderings (1990–1993)
Charlier's death coincided by chance with the growing problems at Novedi, and Giraud suggested to Philippe Charlier, the heir and steward of his father's legacy, to move all his fathers co-creations to Les Humanoïdes Associés (with whom Giraud maintained close personal and creative ties after his Métal Hurlant days – which had included "Nez Cassé" – among others by having them publish his acclaimed L'Incal series), to step up to the plate vacated by Novedi. Yet, Giraud undertook no further action himself, partly because he was still residing in the United States, too preoccupied with his own projects and the wrapping up of his affairs over there before his return to France (and thus too busy to be engaged in secret negotiations with Novedi), and partly because his marriage to his first wife Claudine was in the early stages of falling apart at the time. Charlier Jr. approached Fabrice Giger, who had bought the by Giraud co-founded publisher previously in early 1989, but did not choose for that publishing house eventually, but rather go with Giger's original, founding publishing house, Alpen Publishers, the latter had set up in 1988 in Switzerland – even though comic artists themselves, due to the close entanglement of Alpen and Humanoïdes, always referred to Alpen as "Humanos" (see quote boxes below). It turned out that Philippe was actually picking up where his father had left off. Around the time he had established Alpen and unbeknownst to Giraud, Giger was already approached by Charlier Sr. in 1988. The veteran Charlier had already sensed the writings on the wall at Novedi and discussed plans with Giger to have all his comic creations moved over to the new publisher, arguably the very reason for the then 23-year old Giger to set up Alpen in the first place, and had to this end already arranged his old friend  from his Pilote days to be hired as editor-in-chief at the new publisher, incidentally in the process doing exactly what his son would later accuse Giraud/Novedi of. Giger disclosed in 2008 that it was on the occasion of his subsequent dealings with Philippe that the "JMC Aventures" foundation was established, intended to safeguard the commercial and artistic legacy of Charlier's body of work. Giger stated: "After the death of Jean-Michel, a project was born between his son, Philippe, his mother, and us, to create a structure dedicated to the continuation of the series co-created by Charlier, JMC Aventures. We were shareholders with the Charlier family", confirming the preliminary dealings with the author in his final year.

The relatively short tenure at Alpen saw the release of "Arizona Love", which was actually started under the aegis of Novedi, but for which Charlier had not yet contracted with the publisher because of his hunch, thus leaving the title legally "free" for JMC Aventures to be signed with Alpen, according to Giger, adding that this had the "full and immediate blessing" from Giraud. The artist himself though, taken completely unawares and having had little choice in the matter, has later expressed a slightly different opinion, where it was implied that he was not as happy with the behind-the-scenes machinations as Giger made it out to be, especially since his late script partner had kept him out of the loop in 1988. Ironically, it was Philippe Charlier himself who indirectly conceded that particular point when he accused Giraud of wanting "to settle scores" with Charlier Sr. with the later OK Corral-cycle, which Philippe had issues with (see below). Additional Alpen releases included the La Jeunesse de Blueberry title "Trois hommes pour Atlanta", as well as the inception of the spin-off series Marshal Blueberry with two titles, aside from additions to the Les Gringos and Redbeard series, taken over by other artists after both Jijé and Charlier Sr. had passed away. While the initial intention was to have the entire body of work of Charlier published at Alpen, the corporation with the publisher did not pan out for undisclosed reasons – though Giger had mentioned increasingly difficult copyright negotiations with other copyright holders, predominantly heirs of other artists who had worked with Charlier, the widow of Jijé in particular, who had successfully taken Giger and Charlier Jr. to court. The relationship was ended in 1992, shortly thereafter followed by the demise of Alpen itself in 1994 with Guy Vidal moving over, or rather returning, to Dargaud (having taken on the writing for Les Gringos after his friend's death, until his own death in 2002), though Giger himself became successful with Humanoïdes, expanding into the United States as "Humanoids Publishing Ltd." in 1999, in the process reissuing much of Giraud's "Mœbius" science fiction work.

As Belgian publisher Dupuis had already shown interest, when they serialized "La dernière carte" in their Spirou magazine in 1983, Charlier Jr. now decided to try his luck at that publishing house in 1992, as Hermann had already done previously with his Jeremiah for that matter. While Jeremiah has remained with Dupuis ever since, for again unknown reasons the cooperation with Blueberry did not seem to pan out either. Even though Dupuis did reissue all the (Young) Blueberry titles of the EDI-3-BD/Novedi era (but none from Alpen Publishers, or indeed any of the other Charlier creations) under its own imprint in their "Repérages" collection, no new titles were released during the equally short 1992-1993 tenure of Blueberry at that publisher.

Return to the parent publisher (1993–present)

Tiring of Giraud's inaction, Philippe Charlier ultimately took matters into his own hand, and had all his father's co-creations return to parent publisher Dargaud at the end of 1993 without apparent objections from Giraud (though he had stipulated an exemption for non-comic Blueberry art, produced either on personal title and/or for his own publishing houses Gentiane/Aedena, Starwatcher Graphics, and Stardom – see below), and it is there where Blueberry has remained ever since. The for Dargaud joyous occasion of now having acquired the copyrights of all Blueberry comic incarnations, was reason enough to ask Giraud – now serving as the sole main series artist – to embark on a new story-arc, which eventually resulted in the OK Corral cycle, the last one of the main series as it turned out to be. How thrilled Dargaud was to have reacquired Blueberry was amply demonstrated – aside from their decision to revitalize the serialized pre-publication format for Blueberry as already mentioned – in the 2000 documentary Mister Gir & Mike S. Blueberry made on the occasion of the release of "Geronimo l'Apache", in which instances were shown of the considerable marketing efforts the publisher undertook in order to promote the new album – the documentary therefore itself one such instance – among others by having many Parisian metro stations plastered with huge Blueberry posters. Aside from this, Dargaud made use of the opportunity to clean up the by then muddied release chronology, by formalizing the establishment of the three series and restarting the album numbering for each in reprint runs. Concurrently, all international licenses were renegotiated.

Apart from foreign language publishers and constituting a break in tradition, Dargaud also started to occasionally farm out special, one-time only, series licenses to other Francophone publishers, which besides the aforementioned 2013–2014 with editorial pages enhanced all-series "La Collection Blueberry" from Hachette, already included the French book club  for its 2003 main series releases. Another Francophone publisher who was granted a special license for the main series only was the French-Belgian newspaper Le Soir who released its "Blueberry Intégrale" in two editions, the fifteen-volume edition of 2009, and the sixteen-volume edition of 2015. Like the France Loisirs release, each volume, save three in the end, collected two of the original albums and was only offered to newspaper readers and subscribers. The three single album volumes (No's 8, 15 and 16) were augmented with new Blueberry art, featured in a separate section and separately negotiated for with Giraud's own publisher, Mœbius Production. Nor were the one-time only special licenses limited to Francophone publishers alone; Spanish publisher Planeta DeAgostini, in conjuncture with partwork specialist , acquired one as well for their 2017-2019 54-volume "Blueberry Edición Coleccionista", very similar in concept to the earlier Hachette collection, but with the editorials written by Spanish comic author and historian Jorge Garcia. In a very rare case of cross-fertilization, Altaya started in 2021 to release a translated version of the "Edición Coleccionista" on the French home market as the "Edition Collector", at a time when reprint runs of individual titles were all but terminated on the home market for reasons explained below.

Jean-Michel Charlier has never witnessed the return of his creations to the parent publisher, nor has he ever mended fences with George Dargaud – for whose publishing house Charlier had made signature contributions after all – and who followed Charlier in death almost to the day one year later on July 18, 1990. To a large extent the publication wanderings of Blueberry has been mirrored in other European countries as well, particularly in Germany (where the era was referred to as "Der 'heimatlose' Blueberry" – "The 'homeless' Blueberry") and the Scandinavian countries (the Danes referring to the era as "Blueberrys Lange March" – "Blueberry's Long March"), where every publisher change was followed suit by similar changes among local publishers in those territories as well. How confusing this era had been, was exemplified by the aforementioned "La longue marche" title, which has been released in French by no less than six publishers in the time period 1980–2003, or even seven, if one is to include the Super As serialized magazine publication as well.

Though the 2007 "Apaches" title became the last in the main Blueberry series, as creating comics became increasingly difficult for Giraud because his eyesight started to fail him in his last years, he did continue to create single-piece Blueberry art on larger canvases on either commission basis (such as for the aforementioned Le Soir editions) or under the aegis of Mœbius Production until his own death in 2012, much of which sold for considerable prices from 2005 onward, alongside older original Blueberry art Giraud still had in his possession, in specialized comic auctions at such auction houses like Artcurial, Hôtel Drouot and Millon & Associés.

The commemorative series omnibus collection (2012–2019)

Shortly after Jean Giraud had died on 10 March 2012 as well, Dargaud embarked in November that year on the release of the Blueberry main series 9-volume "Intégrale" omnibus collection, completed in December 2019. It quickly evolved into an international release as it has by 2023 become translated into German, Dutch, Spanish, Danish, Finnish, Serbo-Croatian, and Swedish. The German and Danish editions are remarkable in that these countries had already seen their aforementioned and relatively recent 2006-2011 Egmont edition (which had itself been quite elaborate as well), constituting an enduring testament to the continuing popularity of Giraud's Blueberry, particularly in Germany.

It turned out a half year later that such a collection had already been in the works in conjuncture with Giraud himself prior to his death, but not as a general release as eventually realized, but rather as a to 10–12,000 copies one-time-only limited "collector's edition" Francophone market exclusive. As Dargaud deputy manager Philippe Ostermann had explained in the quote box on the right, an economic necessity for a general inégrale release had not yet materialized by the time Giraud died. After Giraud's death though, it was decided with the blessings of both the Giraud, and Charlier heirs to turn the project into a general release after all, which effectively terminated the reprint runs of the individual volumes of the main series in each of the language territories where the collection was released, save for the aforementioned unique special license releases – in some countries, such as Finland, the Netherlands and Sweden, individual volume reprint runs of the main series had already been suspended indefinitely long before the release in those territories of the intégrale edition. The German edition of the collection, carries the subtitle "Collector's Edition", as a reminder of the original intent of the collection, aside from distinguishing it from their Egmont edition.

In 2017, a Marshal Blueberry intégrale, collecting the three individual volumes of the intermezzo mini-series, was additionally released by Dargaud, likewise seeing several international translations. Though similarly executed, it was not released as part of 2012 intégrale series, but rather as a stand-alone, or Hors Séries (HS – "outside the series"), release. Furthermore, it also lacked any editorials – which ironically made the earlier corresponding Egmont release from 2006 the superior one, as that volume did feature editorials.

English translations
The first known English translation of Blueberry was that of the first title "Fort Navajo", and appeared 18 months after its original 1963 French magazine publication and before its first book publication in September 1965. The first outing in the series was serialized in syndication through Charlier's own EdiFrance/EdiPresse agency (albeit on behalf of his employer Dargaud and the only Blueberry title known to have been disseminated in this manner outside Francophone Europe, Spain and Portugal) under its original title in the weekly British comic magazine Valiant, starting its edited and truncated black and white run in issue 15 May 1965 through issue 21 August 1965, fifteen issues in total. Together with the near-simultaneous and similar publication of the story in Dutch (in full and in color in Fix en Fox magazine, issues 26-41, 1965), both actually stand out as the first known non-French publications of Blueberry, or of any other work by Giraud (but not Charlier) for that matter. However, the growing popularity of the comic elsewhere in Europe from 1967 onward notwithstanding, the Netherlands included, "Fort Navajo" remained until 1977 the only Blueberry title translated in English.

The first four English book translations of Blueberry comics were published in Europe for release in the UK in the late seventies by Danish/British joint venture Egmont/Methuen, when Egmont, holding an international license at the time, was in the process of releasing the series on a wider, international scale, for Germany and the Scandinavian countries in particular. While Egmont completed the publication of the then existing series in whole for the latter two language areas, publication of the English titles already ceased after volume 4. Parent publisher Dargaud had planned to reissue these titles and more for the North-American market in 1982/83 through their short-lived international (American) branch, but of these, only one was eventually released. That then unnoticed title, "The Man with the Silver Star", has, despite the fact that Giraud's art style had by now fully blossomed into his distinctive own, not been included in later North American collections, resulting in the book becoming an expensive rarity.

Since then better marketed English translations were published by other companies which included Marvel Comics (under its Epic imprint), Comcat, Mojo Press and Dark Horse Comics, resulting in all kinds of formats and quality—from b/w, American comic book sized budget collections to full color European graphic novel style albums with many extras. Actually this was the first time Blueberry was published under Giraud's pseudonym, Moebius. As Randy and Jean-Marc Lofficier, the translator couple for all these editions, related: "This is quite ironic because Giraud first coined the 'Moebius' pseudonym precisely because he wanted to keep his two bodies of work separate. Yet, the artist recognizes the fact that he has now become better known in this country under his 'nom-de-plume' and this is his way of making it official!" In effect, the ploy was more than opportune, as Epic had already started out with the publication of Giraud's better known science fiction work under his pseudonym – introduced to American readership through Heavy Metal in the mid-1970s – in the graphic novel format, and it was only when these were well underway that it was decided to add Blueberry as well to the array. All Giraud/Moebius titles were released by Epic in a for the US relatively modest print run of 20.000 copies per title. To make the project as economically viable as possible, it was decided to collect two of the original Blueberry titles in one book, to justify the by Americans perceived high price of around US$13, which, excepting the first two titles of the "Iron Horse" story-arc, made the Epic releases in essence "intégrales" themselves. Giraud conceded that the Blueberry series, due to the sharply diminished interest in the Western genre in the country at the time and contrary to his similarly released Sci-Fi and fantasy work as Mœbius by Epic, were very slow sellers in the US, though the entire printing did manage to eventually sell out over the years. In addition to citing the Americans' complete and absolute obsession with the "Superhero" genres, Giraud has also remarked a few years later, "One cannot say that the results were all that convincing. Jean-Marc Lofficier did of course a fine job in convincing Marvel to reissue Blueberry in the States, but it was above all a matter of prestige. In hindsight, I think today that it might have stood a better chance if the Blueberry plates had seen daily publication in the pages of the Herald Tribune or Los Angeles Times, which is of course a perfectly utopian notion. The recognition of all the work signed with "Mœbius" on the other hand, is total."

It was for Epic that Giraud created new Blueberry book cover art (which he had only done once previously for the first four German book releases by Koralle, nor would he ever again), and to the chagrin of parent publisher Dargaud this art – as is indeed all outside the main comics proper Blueberry art, such as magazine covers, art portfolios, posters and the like, that Giraud created in this period of time for Koralle, Les Humanoïdes Associés, as well as his own publishing houses Gentiane, Starwatcher Graphics, Stardom and the subsequent Moebius Production remain outside the legal purview of Dargaud, even after they had reacquired the Blueberry copyrights in 1993. In practice this means that Dargaud can not use this art at will for their own later publications, such as the 2012 anthology releases, without coming to some sort of legal and financial arrangement with the copyright holders – i.e. Giraud himself in the vast majority of cases (as of 2012, his heirs and with whom Dargaud apparently had, as some non-Dargaud controlled art has been published in the last three volumes of the 2012 anthology release) – as Dargaud licensees have to do as well on individual basis, and of which the short story "Three Black Birds" is the most glaring and, for fans, the most painful one (see below – Dargaud had only been able to secure a few excerpts for publication in the eighth volume of their 2012 release). German author Martin Jürgeit (co-author of the below-listed reference book) has confirmed being confronted with this when he served as editor-in-chief for the German-language version of Egmont's earlier mentioned anthology collection. Dead set on having all available Blueberry material included in his version, he found himself frequently frustrated in this regard on more than one occasion. He stated as late as 2012: "As things now stand, it is highly unlikely that the vast majority of this material will be included, as Dargaud does not own the copyrights. And it is only the Dargaud copyrighted material we can use for the Blueberry-Chroniken, as we have experienced to our dismay on several occasions", referring among others, aside from "Three Black Birds", to the covers for Epic as well. On the other hand, Jürgeit was allowed to incorporate all Blueberry art Giraud had created exclusively for Koralle, which Dargaud was not for their 2012 release.

The Epic publications were very shortly after their initial release collected by American specialty publisher Graphitti Designs in their "Moebius" collection – for whom Giraud created new book plate art, also outside the legal purview of Dargaud – a deluxe limited edition anthology collection, released in a 1500 copies per volume edition, each volume at least containing two of the Epic releases. The collection, which ran for nine volumes, also contained Giraud's science fiction body of work, that was concurrently released by Epic in a similar manner. Volume Moebius #9, containing "The Lost Dutchman's Mine" and "The Ghost with the Golden Bullets", also included the non-Blueberry westerns "King of the Buffalo" (short), and the other Giraud/Charlier western strip, Jim Cutlass: "Mississippi River". Excepting the 1996 Mojo Press release, no additional Blueberry comics have been published in English since 1993, and, again excepting the Mojo Press release, no English Blueberry reprints have seen the light of day either, contrary to his other work as "Moebius".

The Epic collection earned Giraud his below listed American 1991 comic award, augmented with an additional 1997 award nomination for the Mojo Press release, whereas Blueberry in general had already earned him two American comic awards in 1972 and 1973, long before the series had even come to the attention of North-American readership.

1 According to Bedetheque.com, the French books were until volume 18 published in simultaneous conjuncture with Belgian publisher Le Lombard who released these for French-Belgium, initially as soft cover editions, contrary to Dargaud who released these from the start as hard cover books. The same also held true for the first three Young Blueberry titles, then part of the main series. For expedience sake only the French editions from the parent publisher are mentioned. ISBN numbers were not issued until 1975, the Lombard releases actually never receiving any.
2 The 2007 one-shot "Apaches" is an edited book collecting the flashback recollections Blueberry related from "Ombres sur Tombstone" through "Dust" to a journalist while convalescing from a gunshot wound he had sustained in the preceding story, detailing how he, after the war and suffering from a severe case of post traumatic stress syndrome, arrives in the South West in late autumn 1865, and his subsequent dealings with Apache warrior Goyaałé, before the latter came to national attention as Geronimo. There it was revealed that it had been Geronimo who had given Blueberry his Native-American nickname "Tsi-Na-Pah" ("Broken Nose"). For the book Giraud created new pages and panels to improve the flow of the story, and as such the book is readable as a stand-alone prequel title. Notable are the new, last two pages which shows Blueberry leaving his first Far West posting, while wearing the outfit, he is first seen in, in "Fort Navajo", his second posting, providing a seamless continuity (even though Giraud had made a continuity error as one of the panels featured a tombstone engraved with 1881, the year in which the OK Corral story arc, centered around the historical "Gunfight at the O.K. Corral" incident, was set). While the French themselves consider the book outside the main series ("Hors-Séries", the "HS" or "0"-volume) due to the prequel nature of the book, it is otherwise universally considered part of the main series as volume 29 in other countries.
3 IPC Magazines did not employ numbering for their magazine publications at the time, including Valiant.
4 The failure to publish "La piste des Navajos" in the English language, frustratingly left English readers with a cliffhanger, as it was the resolution of a five volume story arc that started with "Fort Navajo". As of 2017, only foreign language editions are available to them.
5 In 2020, the entirety of the main (including "Trail of the Navajo" and "Three Black Birds"), Young Blueberry, and Mister Blueberry series, saw an English language softcover album release by the small independent publisher "Tom Is Jerry Books". A non-profit organization based out of Munich, Germany. As of 2020, the publisher publishes the triannual Pingo Magazine that specializes in contemporary art and mindfulness, with European comics, including Blueberry, as recent Pingo Magazine "special edition" additions of interest. German and English are chosen as lingua franca for the (print-on-demand-only) albums, but are exclusively sold on an extremely limited basis through some online, museum, and art bookstores in a few selected western European cities with the single New York City, USA, bookstore Printed Matter, Inc., as the only one located in an English-language territory.
6 While it is above stated by Lofficier that Blueberry is not about a handsome cowboy who "rides into town, saves the ranch, becomes the new sheriff and marries the schoolmarm", the sixth, stand-alone title "The Man with the Silver Star" is ironically exactly that. Moreover, the story was clearly a take on Howard Hawk's classic 1959 Western Rio Bravo, a circumstance not lost on the passionate Western fan Giraud, who confronted Charlier with the similarities: "I have never understood why Charlier has written it. I talked to him about it, but it seemed he was not aware of it; he has never been one for cinema. He must have had unconsciously remembered the movie, and apparently completely suppressed the memory of it. You know, these things happen, and one can not automatically assume plagiarism. As the theme of Rio Bravo is so incredibly strong, it is hard to forget, even if you have forgotten the movie itself". Giraud paid homage to the movie by having the main cast appear in a few background cameos. The assertions of Giraud notwithstanding, the possibility of plagiarism allegations might explain why this title was left out by Epic, despite the already mentioned fact that Giraud's art style was by now fully his own. Still, "The Man with the Silver Star" has remained the only Blueberry title purely patterned after the template as set by the classic American Western genre.
7 As the title already suggested, "The Lost Dutchman's Mine" was a take on the real world "Lost Dutchman's Gold Mine legend", and in the original publications the Lückner and "Prosit" characters were from Prussia as specifically intended by Charlier, and as indicated by the "Allemand" (French for "German") reference in the French book title, therefore adhering to the actual legend in this respect. Translator Lofficier chose the for Americans familiar-sounding name of the real legend as title for the American book release, but changed the characters to being denizens from the Netherlands, in the process changing the original expletives from German to Dutch in his translations, aside from altering the German name spellings accordingly. Though Lofficier, married to a US citizen, had worked for decades in the US in the publishing world, acquiring an excellent knowledge of American English and idiom, he had made a mistake when he interpreted the moniker "Dutch" as currently – and originally – understood, too literally – as in from/of the Netherlands. Being of French descent, Lofficier had not realized that in the United States of the mid-to-late 19th century, the expression "Dutch" has had a different meaning (Charlier, who was aware of this, had by that time already passed away, and thus unable to set Lofficier straight), as it was by Americans invariably employed to refer to people and language of German descent/origin, due to the massive influx of German speaking immigrants in that period of time. These immigrants referred to themselves as "Deutch" in their own language, and the phonetic similarity is the more commonly accepted rationale for the phenomenon, and it was not until the turn of the century that "Dutch" regained its original meaning. The phenomenon has not applied for Canada.
8 In the case of Epic's "Chihuahua Pearl", "Ballad for a Coffin", "Angel Face", "The Ghost Tribe", and "The End of the Trail" book releases, Titan Books has issued the same, virtually identical books (save for the ISBN numbers and publisher's logo) for the UK market, with a few months delay. The other Epic Blueberry titles only saw a US release, the Titan editions thereby becoming the last British Blueberry publications. These editions were released in a relatively modest print run of 6.000 copies per title, as Giraud himself has divulged, though he has added: "Mind you, British readers were delighted; As a matter of fact, they adore [continental] European comics, which we had not quite recognized over here [France] at the time...".
9 "Le hors-la-loi" literally translates as "'The one outside the law", in meaning exactly the same as "L'outlaw". France however, is one of the few remaining European countries where the use of anglicisms is actively discouraged and combated by cultural authorities, resulting in the use of the more laborious expression as the book title.
10 Volumes 19-21 were in France and French-Belgium simultaneously released by two different publishers, albeit under the same ISBN number. The French publisher is listed first.
11 After Blueberry's rehabilitation in "Le bout de la piste", Charlier had planned to have him return to the US Army as captain, heading a unit of Apache Scouts. After Charlier's death, Giraud became of different mind when he embarked on the OK Corral story arc, turning the hero in to a loafing civilian, because of his new-found wealth and spending his days with poker, as he felt that it would have been too illogical and too implausible for Blueberry to return to the very same organization that had caused him so much grief and injustice.
12 Mojo Press published a black and white, American comic book sized budget collection: The Blueberry Saga #1: The Confederate Gold in 1996. It contains the following stories: "Chihuahua Pearl", "The Half-A-Million Dollar Man", "Ballad for a Coffin", "The Outlaw", "Angel Face". It also featured the first-time book publication worldwide of the 14-page Blueberry short, "Three Black Birds" – the year previously released under the same title as a limited edition, 28-sheet mini portfolio by Stardom, Giraud's own publishing house – which was actually set directly after the events depicted in "Arizona Love", though that title was not included in the anthology. As the title already implied, the book was coined after the actual, so-called "Confederate gold myth". When introduced at the April 1996 WonderCon, copies sold at the convention came with a separate , some of which signed by the artist. A staple in the European comic scene as a collector's item, it was not recognized by American buyers as such. Being at the time unfamiliar with the phenomenon, and since the ex-libris featured blown-up interior art instead of original art, many of them mistook it, the unsigned ones in particular, as a discardable commercial insert, something American (magazine) readers were very much familiar with. As a result, the ex-libris has therefore become a very rare collectible, prized by European collectors in particular.
13 There is a chronology gap of eight years between "Arizona Love" and "Mister Blueberry", which was specifically intended by Giraud: "Mister Blueberry takes place eight years later, which leaves room for further romantic speculations. Surely, many readers will ask themselves, what Blueberry has been up to in the intervening time". Yet, what the creators had overlooked however, was that they had made a continuity error, by placing the events in "Arizona Love" in 1889 in the opening panel, whereas Giraud clearly had meant 1873, amply demonstrated by him correcting the year in "Three Black Birds". In later reprints corrected to "late 1872", the original year mentioning had European fans initially and erroneously assuming that "Arizona Love" was the first part of the OK Corral story arc.
14 When Giraud was preparing to embark on the Mister Blueberry cycle at the start of 1995, he was fully intent on making it a new spin-off series, akin to the Young Blueberry or Marshal Blueberry series, and not as a continuation of the main series. He stated at the time, "I am preparing a Blueberry as follow-up to the Fort Navajo adventures, but which will constitute a new series: "Mister Blueberry". In effect, Blueberry is no longer in the army, he isn't even a lieutenant anymore. It is quite logical for the series to change its title..." Nonetheless, publisher Dargaud adamantly refused to go along with Giraud's intent, and published the first story as volume 24 of the main series. In hindsight however, this turned out to be unexpectedly fortuitous for Giraud, as it legally prevented Charlier heir Philippe, who became opposed to the story cycle, to exercise a publication veto.

Non-English translations
Since its inception, the series has steadily gained a large following in Europe, and has, in part or in whole, been extensively translated in both serialized and book versions into multiple languages aside from English, to wit, Spanish (both Spain proper and the Americas), Portuguese (including Brasil), Italian, German, Dutch, Swedish, Danish, Norwegian, Polish, Finnish, Serbo-Croatian, Hungarian, Greek, Icelandic, Turkish, Tamil, Indonesian and, more recently, Japanese with even more recent additions in Chinese. At least one title – "L'homme à l'étoile d'argent" – is known to have seen a relatively recent translation in Arabic in the Egyptian weekly comic magazine New Magic Carpet (بساط الريح الجديدة), issues 1–11, 2009. In Spanish and Portuguese Blueberry has seen (licensed) publications by local publishers in the Americas, as it has in the former Yugoslavia after its disintegration into its constituent parts. In the European Union, in case of trans-border language areas, it has become customary from the mid-1980s onward, to have publishing rights reside with one publisher only. Like it was in native France, most countries have seen Blueberry pre-published in magazine serials. The Portuguese 1969 "Fort Navajo" publication from Editorial Íbis is the earliest known instance of a Blueberry title to be released directly as album, without prior serialized magazine pre-publication, contrary to the 1965 French and 1968 Spanish album releases, the three of them – all executed in the hard cover format incidentally, save for the French-Belgian Le Lombard release – becoming the only available book versions of the story until 1974.

Album publication of "Fort Navajo", because Charlier had chosen to disseminate the title outside the French, Spanish and Portuguese language areas in magazine syndication, has posed problems for publishers in other language countries, especially in Germany and north-west Europe, when Blueberry broke out in popularity in the late 1960s–early 1970s, well before the syndication term was to expire in 1974. It is not known why Charlier had chosen this format for "Fort Navajo", as the US derived syndication format was by that time already well on its way out for European comics, after the relative immediate post-war paper shortage was no longer an issue. Since "Fort Navajo" was the first part of a five book story arc, this caused continuity, or rather chronology problems as publishers were not yet able to publish the book in their countries. The respective publishers all went about the conundrum in their own way; in Germany the book was first re-serialized as a magazine publication, before continuing with the book releases of the subsequent titles; in the Netherlands and Flanders it was decided to push ahead with book publication regardless of "Fort Navajo", and in the Scandinavian countries it was decided to forego on the publication of the first five titles altogether for the time being, instead opting to start book publication with book six, "L'homme à l'étoile d'argent", leaving publication of the first five titles for a future point in time. No matter what solution was chosen, it became one of the reasons for the messed up book release chronologies for those countries (only aggravated by both the later addition of Young, and Marshal Blueberry book titles as well as the aforementioned publishing wanderings), confusing readership, especially in Germany. It was Finnish publisher Sanoma that became the first publisher able to release the first other language book edition of the title in 1974, directly after the syndication term had expired, as "Navaho: Väijytys Punaisessa laaksossa" (notice the Finnish adherence to the originally intended series name, by now dropped by the parent publisher), that country's first Blueberry book publication, thereby avoiding the conundrum. Nor had the conundrum been an issue for the UK, as book publication only started in 1977.

In the United States, California based distributor Public Square Books (currently known as Zócalo Public Square) imported Blueberry books from Spanish publisher Norma Editorial, S.A. on behalf of the Spanish speaking part of the country. Having done so in the first half of the 2000s, these books were endowed with American ISBN numbers in the form of a bar code sticker, simply put over the Spanish ISBN number. For example, "Arizona Love" originally carried the Spanish , but once imported in the US, received the new, American . Latino-Americans therefore, have been afforded the opportunity to enjoy the then entirety of the Blueberry series (including the spin-offs), contrary to their English speaking counterparts.

Apart from Europe, the Americas, Japan, Indonesia and China, the series (or parts thereof) has been translated on the Indian subcontinent in Mizo by Mahlua of Cydit Communications, operating out of Aizawl, and in Tamil. It is in the latter language in particular, spoken in the south-eastern part of India, Tamil Nadu, and on the island state of Sri Lanka, that the Blueberry saga has amassed a large fanbase and where he is dubbed "Captain Tiger" (கேப்டன் டைகர்). All three series (save Young Blueberry by Corteggiani/Blanc-Dumont – see below) have been published by Prakash Publishers under their own "Lion, Muthu Comics" imprints. In April 2015, an exclusive collectors edition was published in Tamil, collecting Blueberry titles 13 through 22 – with "Arizona Love" added in first time Tamil translation – in one 540-paged book. This is considered to be a milestone release in the entire Indian comics history, as well as one of the biggest collector editions of Blueberry comics worldwide, although it had already been surpassed by the time of its release by an even more massive, entire main series – save "Apaches" – single book anthology of 1456 pages by parent publisher Dargaud in the original language, the year previously.

Prequel, intermezzo, and sequel sub-series
A "prequel" series, La Jeunesse de Blueberry (Young Blueberry), and the "intermezzo" series Marshal Blueberry have been published as well, with other artists and writers, most famously William Vance for the latter. Despite dogged efforts on the part of Giraud, the intended Blueberry 1900 sequel did not come to fruition for extraneous reasons.

Prequel: La Jeunesse de Blueberry (Young Blueberry)

A later created prequel series, dealt with Blueberry's early years, during the American Civil War, relating how the racist son of a wealthy plantation owner turned into a Yankee bugler and all the adventures after that. The material for the first three albums, conceived by the original Blueberry creators, was originally published in the 1968–1970 mass market paperback sized Super Pocket Pilote series, as in total nine 16-page short stories, eight of them constituting one story-arc set in the war. The first short story, "Tonnerre sur la sierra" ("Thunder on the Sierra"), was actually a post-war stand-alone adventure set before the events depicted in "The Lost Dutchman's Mine". With the exception of the first and the last, "Double jeu" ("Double Cross"), where the coloring was taken on by Giraud himself, all other shorts were originally published in black and white.

In 1995, Giraud slightly contradicted Charlier's birth account of La Jeunesse by divulging that he had already created the "Tonnerre sur la sierra" story by himself, before Charlier actually came up with the Civil War approach: "It was I who scripted the first episode of La Jeunesse de Blueberry. It very much resembled a regular series episode, but much smaller. Charlier subsequently presented me with another idea, the one concerning the American Civil War. I found it an excellent idea and writing started up right away".

Giraud created his La Jeunesse art with the smaller digest size format specifically in mind, and adopted therefore a more loose, less "convoluted" art style which allowed him to create his pages more quickly, already applying the revised technique for "Tonnerre sur la sierra". Additionally, it was for these stories that he started to experiment with applying inks in pen – alongside the brush he had hitherto exclusively employed for the series – a technique he would perfect later on as "Mœbius". While the resulting spontaneous art worked out fine for the smaller sized pages of Superpocket Pilote, it did suffer from the enlargement for the hereafter mentioned album releases, when compared to the larger, more detailed pages for the Pilote main series on which he concurrently continued to work. Still, the experience gained on the La Jeunesse shorts served him well, when he had to create  Jim Cutlass in a hurry a decade later, utilizing a similar technique.

The publication of "La jeunesse de Blueberry" ("Blueberry's Secret") in 1975, the first album to collect the first three shorts of the Civil War story-arc, came as a surprise to Blueberry fans. Having left Blueberry on a cliffhanger with "Angel Face", when Giraud took his extended leave of absence (see above), clamor for new Blueberry titles became such, that publisher Dargaud decided to make the move as a temporary stop-gap solution. For the book publication, the original pages were blown up and by Giraud extended in width, rearranged and (re-)colored, with some panels omitted in the process to fit the then standard album format of 46 pages, when discounting the two disclaimer pages. While the removal of individual panels was regrettable from a graphic art point of view – as it, besides the missing art, also broke up the integrity of Giraud's carefully designed page lay-outs, especially in "3000 Mustangs" – it entailed no consequences for the plot of the shorts, save the first one; in "Blueberry's Secret" the in the synopsis mentioned Long Sam had witnessed the murder Blueberry was accused of and therefore able to prove his innocence, but is gunned down before he is able to do so by the real murderer, who in turn is gunned down by Blueberry, leaving Blueberry without any recourse to prove his innocence. However, for the book publication, the two panels which showed the real murderer being killed were cut, causing a discrepancy as it left readers, unfamiliar with the original publication, wondering why Blueberry was so despondent, as, from their point of view, the real killer was still alive.

The releases of the two follow-up collection albums, "Un Yankee nommé Blueberry" ("A Yankee Named Blueberry") and "Cavalier bleu" ("The Blue Coats"), four years later (in itself an indication that Dargaud had not planned to do so initially, if only for the substantial editorial effort it took in the pre-computer era to adapt the original digest size for the standard sized comic book), turned out to be in equal measure a stop-gap initiative. Unable to resolve the royalties conflict, which had dragged on for five years, Charlier and Giraud turned their back on the parent publisher, leaving for greener pastures elsewhere and taking all of Charlier's co-creations with them. Giraud though, conceded to do the same editorial work he did on behalf of the first album for its two follow-ups. Sensing that it might potentially turn out to be a costly defection, the two Young Blueberry titles were released to make the most of the fervor that had surrounded the return of Blueberry with "Nez Cassé". For Dargaud it indeed turned out to be a costly affair as the two 1979 titles were the last new titles they were able to release for nearly fifteen years, missing out on a period of time in which Blueberry reached the pinnacle of its popularity – seeing, besides new titles in the main series, the birth of two spin-off series as well – even though the publishing rights of the older book titles remained where they were. As the "Thunder on the Sierra" short numbered 14 pages instead of 16, no editorial cutting was necessary for the third book. Apart from the editorial changes to fit the book format and the creation of new covers for the two additional albums, Giraud also made use of the opportunity to recreate a small number of panels to replace those he had felt unhappy about in hindsight, spread over all three albums.

Dargaud considered their three, original creator's, La Jeunesse de Blueberry book titles as part of the main series, until they regained the Blueberry rights in late 1993, and as such have therefore seen translations in most of the aforementioned languages as well. Apart from the expedited release of the two additional La Jeunesse titles, Dargaud also undertook a subsequent action in an attempt to further profit from the upsurge in popularity of Blueberry, by releasing the first six-volume Blueberry integral edition of 1984. A co-production with French publisher , each of the six volumes collected four titles of the then existing main series. Rombaldi was brought into the fold to act as an intermediary in order to negotiate a separate license from Novedi to have the then four Novedi main series titles included as well in volumes 5 and 6, though Dargaud performed a copyright infraction by making sure Novedi was not mentioned as copyright holder in the respective colophons. The three La Jeunesse titles were collected in volume 6. In recognition for their assistance, Rombaldi was retained for similar releases of the two other Dargaud Western series,  (see also below) and  – each, like Blueberry, one of the "big five" 1970s Franco-Belgian realistic Western comics – combining all of them in one overall, eleven-volume Les géants du l'Ouest collection, as promoted in contemporary advertisements.

The 1990 English language edition of these books by Catalan Communications in their "ComCat" line, gave track of the changes and presented the left out panels in editorials in which Giraud himself presented clarifications for the choices made. It was in effect American readership that was first afforded a clarification for the discrepancy in the first book and the editorial changes made, before European readers were, in the editorials by Lofficier of the releases. Only these first three books were published in English. The three American albums, again translated by the Lofficier couple, were also, unaltered and unedited, included in the above-mentioned anthology collection from Graphitti Designs. The Graphitti Designs "Young Blueberry" anthology title differed from the others in that it was not printed on high gloss paper, but on matte paper as in the original ComCat publications, indicating that by then inclusion in the Graphitti Moebius collection was already accounted for and that the original print run of the interior pages was adjusted accordingly.

15Stand-alone "uncut" anthologies of the shorts, predominantly in black and white as use was made of the original Super Pocket Pilote source material instead of the book versions, have previously been published in Denmark, Germany and Croatia, albeit it an illegal one in the latter case. With the exception of a latter-day 2017 illegal, extremely limited, Dutch-language edition, none have seen the day of light to date in the rest of the world, including home country France.
16 In their haste to release the two follow-up titles, in the process also having to pay "renegade" Giraud for his input, the editorial office of Dargaud made a substantial editorial blunder. As stated, eight of the nine shorts constituted one long story-arc, but Dargaud placed "Chasse à l'homme" ("Manhunt", the fifth short in the story-arc) as the penultimate one in book 3, causing an awful continuity error. Readers, not familiar with the original Super Pocket Pilote publications, found themselves facing a baffling and inexplicable plot twist, only aggravated by the publisher who in unconvincing and confusing text captions tried to explain the discrepancy away, leaving uninitiated fans at the time erroneously suspecting that not all shorts were being published. In the publisher's defense however, Charlier had confusingly, but unintentionally, given two of his shorts an identical title in French and it is not that much a stretch of the imagination to assume the editors believing that the two stories belonged with each other. Fortunately for the American readership, the correct chronology, pursuant a first correction in the aforementioned Danish anthology earlier that year, was adhered to in the ComCat releases. Ironically, the French themselves, as indeed the rest of Europe, had to wait until 1995 (the Dutch actually beating the French to the punch by one year) before the publisher, pursuant regaining the Blueberry rights, could be bothered to correct the chronology for later reprint runs, after having it allowed to persevere for nearly two decades in numerous prior reprint runs for all language editions, the Danish and American editions excepted.
17 Despite the creators being entitled to royalties, Dargaud's ploy to capitalize on the upsurge in popularity of Blueberry did not sit well with Charlier, who recognized it for what it was. In order to vent his displeasure, Charlier again made use of the exemption clause of his syndication agency, and established the temporary Editions Presses Internationales (EPI) imprint, under which he published a small Lieutenant Blueberry Pocket series of three outings in 1982, again using Koralle's – in whose employ he had been shortly before – infrastructure. Making sure that these three digit-sized releases were technically and legally magazine releases, akin to the Super Pocket Pilote source publications, all the shorts from Dargaud's two additional albums were reprinted in the series. The shorts were presented uncut, with yet another new coloring, but featured Giraud's redrawn panels. Ironically though, Charlier too failed to correct the chronology. To drive home the point, the pockets also contained Charlier's two Redbeard shorts, as Dargaud had also employed a similar ploy for that series, as indeed they also had for Tanguy et Laverdure for that matter. Charlier licensed Koralle to follow suit by establishing the equally temporary Gary Publishing imprint for identical publication in Dutch. These were actually among the last known releases by Koralle, as the publisher was already in an advanced state of becoming defunct. That parent company Axel Springer even allowed the publications to go through at this late stage, should be considered another token of goodwill in recognition of Charlier's help in the smooth transition from Koralle to Novedi, as these pockets saw no release in the German home language, or in any other for that matter. Charlier concurrently farmed out a license to Danish publisher Interpresse (then the Novedi licensed Blueberry publisher) to publish the Blueberry shorts in their Jonah Hex monthly magazine. Dargaud at the time had license agreements with competitors Oberon and Serieforlaget for the Netherlands and Denmark respectively.

Change of artist (I)

After "Angel Face" was completed in 1974, Giraud took an extended leave of absence from Blueberry, because he wanted further explore and develop his "Moebius" alter ego, the work he produced as such being published in Métal Hurlant magazine, in the process revolutionizing the Franco-Belgian world of bandes dessinées. Having ended "Angel Face" on a cliffhanger, Giraud's return to Blueberry five years later with "Broken Nose" became a media event of considerable proportions and demand for Blueberry reached an all-time high. It was then that the creators decided to revisit the Young Blueberry adventures as well, which had ended its run in Super Pocket Pilote. Giraud was nowhere near able to take on yet another major series himself, as he was still working on his Incal series as Moebius, besides having embarked on Blueberry again.

There actually had been an additional, more prosaic reason as well for the decision to do so. After Giraud had finished "La dernière carte" he, having been very much invested throughout most of his adult life in New Age beliefs and practices (which included the use of mind-expanding substances), had already left for Tahiti to join the commune of mystic Jean-Paul Appel-Guéry, the latter had set up there. After a stay of nearly two years, Giraud moved to the United States in late 1984 and set up shop firstly in Santa Monica, and subsequently in Venice and Woodland Hills, California. It was in this era that his work was published by Marvel/Epic for the US market. Publisher Novedi feared, not entirely unjustified – as the release lag between the two books had already increased from eighteen months to three years – that it endangered the publication regularity of the main series, and resurrecting, or more accurately, creating the Young Blueberry series, was the back-up strategy they had in mind. Novedi had solid reasons to do so, as any new Blueberry title in that particular period of time enjoyed an (all-language) European first print run of 500.000 copies – thus discounting any later reprint run – for European standards a very respectable print run.

Publisher and creators subsequently embarked on a search for a suitable artist to take on the task. It was then that fate intervened when Giraud, before his departure to Tahiti, discovered the work of the still unknown ex-pat Colin Wilson from New Zealand, who was publishing a science fiction comic series Dans l'Ombre du Soleil – for which Wilson did both the writing and the art – for the French Circus comic magazine, which featured the character "Raël" (also the first story title) that shared a stunning resemblance with Blueberry. Wilson was actually was a huge Giraud fan himself and had modeled his "Raël" character after a Western hero he had created for the New Zealand fanzine Strips, and who in turn was modeled after Blueberry. Ironically in hindsight, it were the original black & white La Jeunesse de Blueberry shorts that introduced Wilson to Blueberry as some Super Pilote Pocket issues had somehow found their to way to New Zealand, then a country without a comic tradition to speak of, according to Wilson. His admiration for Franco-Belgian bande dessinée artists, Giraud in particular, became in 1980 the driving force for Wilson to try his luck as such in Europe, aside from the fact that his native country did not afford any opportunities to become one professionally. Wilson reiterated in 1986: "Those drawings of Giraud convinced me to leave New Zealand. If that's what European comics are like then I wanted to be a part of it". It was comic artist François Corteggiani who brought Wilson to the attention of Giraud by sending him a few pages of the "Raël" comic, and who in turn brought them to the attention of his co-worker Charlier (or vice versa as sources are not in concordance with each other).

Unaware that his work was already brought to the attention of his idol and his co-worker, Corteggiani arranged Wilson's first face-to-face meeting with them in September 1983 in Paris. Wilson said: "To have a discussion with Giraud, what a chance! That's why I immediately said yes to François Corteggiani". Much to his own surprise, Wilson was almost immediately asked if he was interested to take on the new Young Blueberry series. After having accepted, he developed a close and warm working relationship with Charlier, and the Wilson/ couple befriended both him and his wife Christine, with household visits back and forth. The Charlier couple not only helped their friends (neither of them French-speaking and staying on a tourist visa in Amsterdam at the time) to settle firstly in Brussels, Belgium, and subsequently in the Provence, France, but with practical work details as well, as Wilson later recalled: "Janet and I were tremendously lucky, Charlier was in many respects something of a kind uncle to us. He did not make a fuss about anything. He really stuck out his neck for me by involving me, a virtually unknown young artist, in a success series. I know he could be tough as nails with publishers. We were fortunate though, that he negotiated on our behalf as well, and we profited very much from the deals he struck". Wilson was signed for five albums. Corteggiani himself was yet to leave his mark on the La Jeunesse de Blueberry series later on. Wilson became the second, and last Charlier artist, after Giraud, whom the author provided with script pages in a timely fashion, once even receiving a page overnighted from Kuwait where the author then was on documentary assignment, just to keep his artist working.

After a short apprenticeship (during which he produced Blueberry study art) to fine tune his art style, already close to that of Giraud, in order to have it move even closer to that of Giraud, Wilson embarked with fervor on the project with his first outing "Les démons du Missouri" ("Missouri Demons"), which essentially became the rationale for the Young Blueberry adventures to become a spin-off series onto their own. Working seven days a week for ten to twelve hours, Wilson produced five to six pages a month, using a combination of pen and brush for the inks, just as his idol had done for his Jeunesse stories and which had become the inspiration for Wilson to abandon the Rotring technical utensils he had originally used in New-Zealand.

As it had in 1980 when Giraud was working on "La longue marche" with an assistant (see below), rumors quickly abounded in the tight-knit bande dessinée community that Giraud intended to abandon Blueberry. This time around however, and unlike 1980, the rumors found their way to the outside world, causing anxiety in the fan community. Despite the publisher's standing policy of releasing comics directly in album format, it was decided to have "Les démons du Missouri" pre-published in the newspaper France-Soir, one of the largest newspapers in France at the time, in an effort to counteract the growing disquiet. A first for Blueberry insofar daily newspapers were concerned, black & white publication began at the start of 1985, with Wilson feeding the newspaper with half-pages as he went along. The first half-page was accompanied by an editorial from Charlier, in which he tried to allay the fears of the fans (see quotebox). The format was for good measure repeated in 1987 with Wilson's second outing, "Terreur sur le Kansas" ("Terror over Kansas"), for the same newspaper, but abandoned afterwards when Wilson had become an established Blueberry artist himself. France-Soir saw two half-pages (1b and 2a) from "Terreur sur le Kansas" published that were not incorporated in the album, released later that year, for print technical reasons (see also The Blueberry biography in this regard).

Despite the initial trepidations of fans, Wilson's Blueberrys were favorably received, achieving print run numbers approximating those of the main series, as well as seeing translations in nearly as many languages, with English being the glaring one of the few exceptions as of 2017. Wilson has divulged that Novedi released the first album in a first French printing of 150.000 copies (Novedi had by then taken over the publication for France as well) and a Dutch first printing of 50.000 copies, a huge step up from the initial French only 12.000 copy release for the "Raël" album. The French edition sold out in a matter of weeks, and an additional 20.000 copies followed suit in a hurry. Compared to the main series, the first printing was conservative for the French edition and ample for the Dutch edition. It even had a positive side-effect on his science fiction series Dans l'Ombre du Soleil, which saw a Dutch and German series translation after he had embarked on Blueberry, with a Danish and English translation of "Raël" only to boot. Wilson though, had to abandon this series in 1989, having added two more titles, because Blueberry demanded all his attention and energy, aside from the fact that it was the more successful one by far, allowing the couple to move to the Provence. It were not only the fans who were relieved, Wilson too had his trepidations alleviated when he met the fans face-to-face for the first time at several comic convention book signings after the release of the first album, grateful for their gracious reception and acceptance of his Blueberry, even though most of them concurrently and emphatically expressed their relieve that Giraud would continue to be the artist for the main series.

While Wilson was working on "Terreur sur le Kansas", he was asked by Giraud, who had shortly returned to Europe, to finish up on "Le bout de la piste" as well, as he was pressed for time, preparing to leave for California where he just had set up shop. Wilson did part of the inking of "Le bout de la piste", while his girlfriend Janet Gale, who had followed him from New Zealand, took on the coloring. Giraud himself assigned her the task, being impressed by the work she had done on her fiancé's album. Gale was actually a relative novice, as she only started coloring on her fiancé's Dans l'Ombre du Soleil series, having been unable to find legitimate employment in Europe due to her visa status. She would continue to color all her future husband's Blueberry books, as well as several albums from other artists released by Novedi. Giraud himself was from the moment Wilson took over the series no longer involved creatively, aside from occasionally giving his young colleague some advise, but did receive a "small inventor's fee" per title, as he himself had coined it.

While several European countries (including outliers like Iceland and Turkey) had, no post-original creators title – discounting the newspaper serialization of the first two Wilson titles – has seen serialized comic magazine pre-publication in France/French-Belgium itself, where the titles were instead directly released as books. By the time the 1990 "Le raid infernal" was released, virtually every other country had followed suit due to the demise of the serialized magazine format.

Like parent publisher Dargaud, publisher Novedi considered the Young Blueberry books part of the main series at first until 1990, before they were instituted as a separate spin-off series, mostly for the practical reason of wanting to avoid further pollution of release numbering and chronology. Dargaud's stance was adhered to in other European countries, among others in Spain where then regular Blueberry publisher Grijalbo/Ediciones Junior released their 1988-1996 Las aventuras del teniente Blueberry eight-volume integral collection, encompassing all hitherto released Blueberry albums, including those of Wilson. Like Dargaud had to do for their previous Les géants du l'ouest collection, the Spanish had to separately negotiate licenses from Koralle and Novedi for their Blueberry releases, but unlike the Dargaud release, these publishers were dutifully mentioned as copyright holders in the colophons of the respective volumes. Wilson's "Terreur sur le Kansas" became the first album to be released as a separate La Jeunesse series title in 1987, as indicated on its back cover. It was therefore not Dargaud who took the initiative for the move, but rather Novedi, due to the fact that Dargaud had lost the publishing rights for new Blueberry titles, actually missing out on the first five, most successful, titles of the new series as explained. But Dargaud did adopt the format, once these rights had returned to them in late 1993.

Catalan Communications had planned to publish "Missouri Demons", "Terror over Kansas", and beyond in English as well, as additions to their Young Blueberry series in the "ComCat" line from 1991 onward (alongside Hermann's Comanche Western incidentally, another favorite of Wilson), which was already indicated on the back covers of the three original ones published in 1989–1990. The former had in effect already received an ISBN number. Publication came to naught, due to the near-concurrent, but otherwise coincidental, demises of both Novedi and Catalan Communications in early-1990 and mid-1991 respectively.

Jean-Michel Charlier and Colin Wilson
 4: Les démons du Missouri (Novedi, 1985/09)—Missouri Demons (ComCat comics, January 1991, ; canceled)5
 5: Terreur sur le Kansas (Novedi, 1987/10)—Terror Over Kansas (ComCat comics, 1991, canceled)
 6: Le raid infernal (Novedi, 1990/03)

Change of writer
While Charlier's death in July 1989 did not cause succession problems for the main series as explained, it did not held true for the Jeunesse series as both Charlier's heir, Philippe Charlier, and the publisher considered Wilson too much of an inexperienced novice to take on the writing of a major series himself, or as he himself had later put it: "I doubt if "Raël" or "Mantell" accounted for anything at Dargaud [sic, Wilson meant Novedi] in this regard". However, the search for a replacement for Charlier, turned out to be a rather tall order, as none of the established names in the Franco-Belgian comic world were found willing to fill the shoes of the legendary Charlier, whereas non-established names were rejected for pretty much the same reasons why Wilson was not considered as replacement. It was then, in order to break the gridlock, that Wilson suggested François Corteggiani as replacement, deeming it "logical", as he assumed Corteggiani to be an admirer of Charlier. Corteggiani had been one of the lesser names in the Franco-Belgian comic world, having predominantly written a couple of short-lived humorous comic series and one realistic series, the heavily Godfather Trilogy inspired mafia saga De silence et de sang – which he had abandoned in 1986 after only two volumes, only to take it on again ten years later, piggybacking on his newfound notoriety as Blueberry writer. Both critical and commercial success have always eluded Corteggiani, and by the time he was approached by Novedi and Philippe Charlier, he had suspended his own career as a bande dessinée artist, instead becoming a tenured script writer for the French Disney studios. To his credit, Corteggiani refused at first, for the same reason his more established colleagues had already done previously, but eventually conceded on the insistence of Wilson. Wilson had personal reasons to do so, as Corteggiani was a personal friend of the Wilson-couple, aside for the practical reason that he was living in the vicinity of the Wilson-couple at the time. When the non-French speaking Wilson couple first arrived in Europe, they met Corteggiani at the annual Italian Lucca Comics & Games festival. Corteggiani took a shining on the newcomers and took them under his wing. It was Corteggiani, using his vast Franco-Belgian comic world social network, who introduced Wilson to publisher Glénat, resulting in his first European comic series Dans l'Ombre du Soleil, in the process negotiating on behalf of his friend. As already related, it was Corteggiani who, while keeping tabs on the work of his friend, introduced Wilson's work to the Blueberry creators. Wilson reasoned that by suggesting Cortegianni for a major series, he could return the favor he had provided him a few years earlier, by getting his friend's bande dessinée career back on track. Actually, he and Wilson had already started their own Thunderhawks comic series before Charlier died, an aviation comic set shortly after the first world war in the American South-West, but which had to take a backseat due to the fact that the Blueberry series took precedence.

Corteggiani's first order of business was to finish up on the script for "Le raid infernal" which was halfway completed by Charlier at the time of his death. This he did to the satisfaction of all parties involved, including Wilson, and Corteggiani was retained as the Jeunesse writer ever since.

The publication of Wilson's fourth album "La poursuite impitoyable" in 1992 was surprisingly still under the Novedi imprint, over a year after the publishing house had ceased to exist. This can only be explained by the fact that Wilson was originally signed for five albums by Novedi, and that the official receivers of the defunct publisher wanted the revenues for the legal and financial finalization of the bankruptcy. The album therefore became a posthumous Novedi release. All legal issues were apparently resolved by the time of the publication of the fifth Wilson album, "Trois hommes pour Atlanta" one year later, as it was released by Novedi's successor Alpen Publishers, becoming the only Jeunesse title they were able to release, before they themselves lost publication rights to Dargaud in late 1993.

François Corteggiani and Colin Wilson
 7: La poursuite impitoyable (Novedi, 1992/01)
 8: Trois hommes pour Atlanta (Alpen Publishers, 1993/06, no first printing ISBN issued)
 9: Le prix du sang (Dargaud, 1994/10)

Emmet Walsh and the departure of Colin Wilson

Wilson came to regret his loyalty to his friend Corteggiani; while pleased with the scenarios for Le raid infernal and La poursuite impitoyable, he became considerably less pleased with those following these two outings. The artist complained in a 2000 interview (quote box to the right) that Corteggiani's scenarios became increasingly juvenile and decreasingly serious. Wilson reacted by the rapidly declining quality of the scenarios by letting the quality of his artwork, which had been of such a high Giraud-like quality, slide for the two last albums he was yet to pencil by largely reverting to the less detailed loose art style he usually had been (and would be) employing for the American-Anglo comic industry. Even Giraud started to harbor doubts in the same series of interviews albeit in a far more veiled fashion, when he stated that he was " (...)not here to discuss Corteggiani's work" when asked about him, though he was a little more outspoken five years later as evidenced in the quote box below.

After the 1994 album Le prix du sang, Wilson had had enough and decided to create a more mature Young Blueberry story by himself. Taking his cue from Charlier's Blueberry biography where a single mention was made of Blueberry's post-traumatic stress disorder (PTSD), he was suffering from when he returned home after the war, Wilson decided to tell a mature, psychological story of how Blueberry contracted the condition during the war. Coined "Emmet Walsh", the story revolves around the so-named naive southern youth who dreams of heroism and glory and leaves his mother's homestead to join the Confederate forces. It was only five to six pages into the story that young Walsh meets up with Blueberry who takes him under his wing. During their time together both men are confronted with the true horrors of war and young Walsh meets a gruesome end ultimately, leaving a distraught Blueberry well on his way to his PTSD. Wilson, knowing full well that he still lacked the experience to write a scenario for a prime series like Young Blueberry, sought out the advise of both the senior editors at Dargaud and his former mentor Giraud who by then had acquired the experience to write for a prime BD series. Wilson had a tough time convincing the Dargaud editors that knew what he was doing and what he was trying to achieve with his story. Dargaud though requested that Wilson adapted his story so that Blueberry already made an appearance from page one onward. Not wanting to spoil his chances to see his story published, Wilson gave in to their demands and even penciled the first four pages showing the by Dargaud requested adaptations. He refused to budge to Giraud's suggestions though, as they were so many and so drastic that the entire Emmet Walsh storyline vanished almost entirely into the background. Giraud however, had not the intention to belittle his younger colleague, but rather wanted to safeguard him from the confrontation he knew Wilson was headed straight into with both Dargaud and Philippe Charlier. Dargaud had just reacquired the Blueberry copyrights after the very costly defection of the Giraud/Charlier creator team back in 1979, and Giraud was acutely aware – unlike Wilson as the defection had taken place long before his Blueberry engagement – how sensitive the matter of rebellious comics artists was to the publisher. Even more pertinent was the fact that Giraud knew that Philippe Charlier would never go along with the more mature, psychological story Wilson had written, as he as the guardian of his late father's artistic legacy, was of the firm conviction that any addition to his father's body of work should be fast-paced, light, commercially attractive, shallow adventure stories intended for a (male) adolescent readership only, completely unencumbered by mature themes (especially when it concerned something heavy-handed like PTSD), just as Charlier, Jr. believed his father had always intended.

The inevitable took place shortly thereafter when Corteggiani and Charlier Jr. were informed of Wilson's script by Dargaud. As Giraud had already suspected, Charlier Jr. was vehemently opposed and the reaction of Corteggiani was no less vicious. Considering the script a backstabbing betrayal from someone he had considered a friend, Corteggiani's friendship with the Wilson couple was terminated right there and then. Wilson on his part immediately terminated his participation on the second outing of the duo's Thunderhawks aviation series, work on which had just started up by Wilson. Now Wilson found himself faced with the dark side of the tight-knit Franco-Belgian bande dessinée community, the backstabbing backroom politics, discovering to his detriment that Charlier Jr. was very much unlike his father and most definitely not his friend – something that his former mentor Giraud had already discovered for himself in his very own specific case. Both Corteggiani and Charlier Jr. immediately set to work in order to have Wilson – who still was a non-French speaker and therefore completely defenseless against the backroom machinations – entirely removed from the Franco-Belgian bande dessinée scene. Corteggiani in particular set to work with a vengeance as he not only used his Franco-Belgian comic world social network (he had previously used to get Wilson his start in the industry) to make absolutely sure that Wilson would never again work in the Franco-Belgian comics industry, but also by already starting his search for a replacement while Wilson was still employed by Dargaud. The latter was only too happy to give in, and in 1996 Wilson was aggressively manipulated into departing on his own accord. As fully intended by Corteggiani, neither Wilson nor his fiancée (who freelanced as colorist for other Dargaud artists as well besides her fiancé, but who was also targeted by Corteggiani's wrath) were able to find work anywhere else in the industry afterwards, and were forced to leave the EU after Wilson's work permit had expired the following year. The Wilson couple did not return home to New Zealand however, but to Australia as that country did have a comics scene, contrary to their native country, albeit a small one, and it was from there that they were able to slowly rebuild his comics career.

Wilson himself was in the years directly thereafter reluctant to delve too much into the details surrounding his departure, only speaking about it in more generic terms, such as, "(...)it is an immensely popular series, and as one of its creators is no longer among us, it has now become the purview of many other people who have a say in it. So it has become inevitable that series changes. I've played my part...and now it is in the hands of others. I think the readership should make up its mind for themselves", and "I think that nowadays the whole problem with the Blueberry realm is lying in the circumstance that several key persons are making rather dumb decisions. I at least do not wish to be part of it anymore..." On one rare occasion in 2006 though, he did allow his true feelings and frustrations to show through when he stated, "Philippe Charlier was dead-set on making his mark on all series, editors came and went, it became too complicated. I started to pencil comics, because I was a fan, and only wanted to continue doing that, to tell stories without any kind of business hassles."

Dargaud has never issued any kind of official proclamation on Wilson's departure, and when the next Young Blueberry installment was released in 1998 that was not penciled by Wilson, it came as an utter and complete surprise to the Blueberry fanbase and the rest of the outside world. What statements about Wilson's departure there were made thereafter, Dargaud had left entirely to the artists involved who were inclined to do so. Giraud had seemed to err on the side of caution by apparently siding with the new creator team, when he stated in 2005, "When Charlier died, we couldn't continue. He [Wilson] lacked the sharpness and speed to continue alone. He was gradually taken out of the loop by the publisher and the rights holders. I tried to help him, but in vain." The remarkable thing about Giraud's short statement is that it is riddled with half-truths: the later lack of sharpness and his attempts to help him are confirmed, the supposed soft-handed handling of Wilson's departure as well as his supposed lack of production speed are outright lies, besides the false impression he invoked by implying that he and Wilson formed a creative team on the series – as already stated, Giraud had no creative input whatsoever after the original stories he and Charlier had created in the 1960s. A comparison of the publication dates of Wilson's body of work above and those of his replacement below, learns that Wilson produced right on schedule, neither slower nor faster. Stronger still, it was his replacement who started to lag considerably from 2010 onward, not to mention Giraud with both his Marshal Blueberry series as well as his "Mister Blueberry" cycle, a circumstance that had not been lost on Wilson himself. The duplicitous Corteggiani himself spin-doctored Wilson's departure as the artist suffering from a severe bout of homesickness and was dying to return home, a lie he already told Wilson's successor in 1996, and one he would repeat at the very few comics conventions he attended directly after the release of the first non-Wilson Young Blueberry album.

Second change of artist

The artist Corteggiani approached in 1996 turned out to be , the artist of one of the "Big Five" Franco-Belgian western comics in the 1970s, the critically acclaimed Jonathan Cartland series. It was almost certain that Blanc-Dumont had been the only artist Corteggiani sought out as the latter was well aware of the fact that he was a favorite of both Giraud as well as of the late Charlier Sr., who had once stated, "Had I not coincidentally met Jean Giraud, I would have preferably started the long Blueberry saga with Michel Blanc-Dumont." To his credit, Blanc-Dumont had no idea what was going on with the Young Blueberry series and could only rely on what Corteggiani cared to tell him, which was in a non-committal way informing him that there were "some differences of opinion" with Wilson and if Blanc-Dumont was interested to do Blueberry or "something else" with him. As Blanc-Dumont recalled, "He therefore made me a [generic] proposal, like all good scenario writers do." On that occasion Blanc-Dumont had to decline though, as he had to finish up on his aviation comic Colby he had created with Greg and the replacement comic for Cartland (in which he had been very much invested), he, to his immense regret, had to stop due to the illness of his scenario writer Laurence Harlé – who would eventually die from it in 2005 – with whom he had a very close and warm working relationship.

One year later, in January 1997, Blanc-Dumont was again approached by both Philippe Charlier and Jean Giraud during breakfast in a hotel during the Angoulême International Comics Festival, and this time he was asked straight up front if he wanted to take over the Young Blueberry series. Wilson had by then already left, so there was no danger of any potential guilt feelings on the part of Blanc-Dumont. "This series had already been taken over by Colin Wilson, who had delivered very good series outings, the scenarios having been taken over by François Corteggiani. I think it was François who first told me that Wilson wanted to quit to return to his country, New Zealand. And in Angoulême, Philippe Charlier and especially Jean Giraud went further by really asking me to resume the series. Giraud was so happy that I accepted that, when we took the train together to return to Paris, he had to tell me three stories of Blueberry during the trip, he was so overflowing with ideas. This was a great moment for me as well. And I took over La Jeunesse de Blueberry without stress, because I had nothing left to prove," Blanc-Dumont recalled. As it turned out, this was one of the very rare occasions, arguably the only one, that Giraud and Charlier Jr. were of the same mind. As indicated in the quote box above, Giraud was a great admirer of Blanc-Dumont's Cartland art, and had actually already asked him a few years earlier to provide the art for the Blueberry 20 ans après ("Blueberry, 20 years later", the later coined Blueberry 1900 sequel) project he had in mind, a project Blanc-Dumont declined as he was finishing up on the last Cartland outing, and because he deemed Giraud's synopsis too Mœbiusienne for his tastes. Blanc-Dumont had one condition however, "I wished to create a Blanc-Dumont comic, come what may; a Blueberry that is clearly mine, despite the characteristics he had been given by those who had drawn him before, especially those he received from Jean and Charlier. It really had to become my Young Blueberry." Giraud's glee over the appointment of Blanc-Dumont as the new Young Blueberry artist, also served as a rationale for his lackluster support of his erstwhile protégé Colin Wilson.

After the contracts were signed on 8 April 1997, Blanc-Dumont committed himself to deliver four pages a month, stating, "If you have reached page 23, it becomes easier. After that you work in a far more relaxed manner." The first Blanc-Dumont Young Blueberry album, "La solution Pinkerton" was released in November 1998, four years after the publication of the last Wilson album, without any serialized magazine pre-publication. Blanc-Dumont's wife, who had since their betrothal been the colorist on all her husband's work (including Cartland and Colby), was retained as such for his new commission. Claudine incidentally, had already been given the assignment by Dargaud to replace Claude Poppé's original coloring of the first four Blueberry albums for their 1993/94 reprint run and beyond – though the original coloring was restored for the 2012 commemorative omnibus collection.

As touched upon above, the fanbase and outside world were entirely unaware that an artist change had even been in the making, due to Dargaud's complete information black-out, and therefore completely taken aback by the unexpected publication of the first Blanc-Dumont album. While the first Blanc-Dumont outing did reasonably well, because it was a Blueberry installment after all, fans were not quite sure of what to make of it for two reason; firstly the scenario quality that kept declining, and secondly, Blanc-Dumont's artwork itself. Fans could not get used (nor would they ever be, as it turned out) to the somewhat static, almost wooden art style, which worked perfectly for his baroque, psychological and subdued Cartland comic, but considerably less so for a dynamic, action driven comic like Blueberry – nor had it ever done so for his own Colby action comic for that matter, and canceled by Dargaud after only three series outings as a commercial failure, which however, had left an entirely unencumbered Blanc-Dumont completely free to accept the Young Blueberry commission. Foreboding signs on the wall though, became already apparent a couple of years later, painfully so, when Dargaud found itself confronted with ever declining printing numbers for subsequent volumes, as specified hereafter, and the fact that from the very start far fewer foreign publishers were found willing to pick up the Blanc-Dumont version of the series for their territories.

Despite his lack of public support for his erstwhile protégé Wilson, Giraud actually turned out to be in agreement with the latter's critical assessment of Corteggiani's scenarios. Sensing the disquiet among Blueberry fans, but also driven by his desire to get his idol Blanc-Dumont as good a start as humanly possible, Giraud had already in 1997 expressed his interest to take on a more active role in the scenario writing by stating that young Blueberry "would continue to traverse through the war on his merry way, but by taking the realities and the sufferings that war entailed a little bit more into account." Additionally, he came up with an idea to mitigate the negative effects Cortegianni's increasingly juvenile scenarios had on the Blueberry-brand by having Blueberry integrated in a more mature manner into the Jim Cutlass series (created in 1979 by the original Blueberry creators and started up again by Giraud in 1991). "After the Civil War," Giraud clarified in 1997, "we find Blueberry back in a deplorable state; he's wounded, has lost his memory, and it is Cutlass who will help him to regain it. But that's not a blessing at all, because the reason he has amnesia is that he was responsible for a mistake that cost the lives of many people. The story is so crazy that the reporter it is related to, foregoes on publishing it out of fear that no one will believe him." Philippe Charlier however, immediately exercised his veto right to torpedo both Giraud suggestions, rather unsurprisingly actually, as they were in effect indirect, veiled endorsements of the ideas Wilson had put forward in his rejected Emmet Walsh scenario. Charlier Jr.'s obstinacy irked Giraud to no end, and he stated in a later interview, "I would like to do a more tense do-over, meaning, to give it a structure by showing a trajectory and finish, culminating in a very dramatic climax, which explains why, at the end of the War of Succession, Blueberry returns to the West utterly devastated, why he is a drunk, why he is so miserable... some day, it needs to be told!" Giraud actually acted upon this impulse to an extent, by incorporating flashback scenes in the "OK Corral" cycle (later collected in the 2007 stand-alone album "Apaches"), where a bed-ridden Blueberry tells a reporter the story of how he arrived at his first Far West posting directly after the war, completely ravaged by PTSD.

Shortly before his death in March 2012, after having pussyfooted around the subject matter for years, the gloves came finally off when Giraud came with both barrels after the two men he held personally responsible for the devaluation of the Blueberry-brand in the below referenced 2015 Sadoul biography. He blasted Phillipe Charlier in particular for dumbing down the Young Blueberry series by his incessant insistence on commercial infantile shallowness, conceding that even he "was stunned by the levity with which certain sequences were treated" in the series by both men, which he considered an affront to the American Civil War itself and its victims, having in his eyes been reduced to a disrespectful joke and banality. The second sin, equally heinous as far as he was concerned, Giraud had squarely laid at the feet of both Charlier Jr. and Corteggiani was he fact that he was deeply pained to see a bande dessinée artist of Blanc-Dumont's caliber being "forced to take on a second-rate series", after coming from his own major series [Cartland] and being reduced to "take on a series' sequel that isn't his own", which was in effect very similar to the fate that befell Giraud's old mentor Jijé in the end.

Giraud's Young Blueberry author rights incidentally, extended beyond merely collecting the aforementioned "small inventor's fee", as it turned out that he too was entitled to exercise veto rights. Giraud however, had never chosen to exercise these rights, despite his displeasure over the quality of the Young Blueberry series. His reasons for this was that he did not wanted to be the one, responsible for "artists and scenario writers" becoming unable "to feed themselves" – meaning Blanc-Dumont in particular unsurprisingly, but surprisingly the in Giraud's view deeply flawed Corteggiani as well – , adding sardonically that Philippe Charlier had no such qualms whatsoever and that the latter "disgusted" him by being utterly "cold-blooded" in his ruthless haste to "rake in the royalties" as quickly as he was able to without exhibiting any other "consideration beyond that".

François Corteggiani and Michel Blanc-Dumont
note: the last figures specified between the parentheses denote the first Francophone print-run of each individual volume, where known.
 10: La solution Pinkerton (Dargaud, 1998/11)
 11: La piste des maudits (Dargaud, 2000/01)
 12: Dernier train pour Washington (Dargaud, 2001/11, 100,000)
 13: Il faut tuer Lincoln (Dargaud, 2003/05, 100,000)
 14: Le boucher de Cincinnati (Dargaud, 2005/09, 90,000)
 15: La sirene de Vera-Cruz (Dargaud, 2006/10 , 80,000)
 16: 100 dollars pour mourir (Dargaud, 2007/09, 60,000)
 17: Le Sentier des larmes (Dargaud, 2008/11, 66,000)
 18: 1276 âmes (Dargaud, 2009/09, 55,000)
 19: Redemption (Dargaud, 2010/09, 55,000)
 20: Gettysburg (Dargaud, 2012/05, 45,000)
 21: Le convoi des bannis (Dargaud, 2015/12, 40,000)

No formal post-original creators editions have seen the day of light in the English language as of 20165, but, like the source series, the Young Blueberry spin-off series did see translations in numerous languages, the three titles by the original creators and the Wilson outings specifically, but appreciatively less so for the subsequent releases. The latter is amply exemplified by the Corteggiani/Blanc-Dumont versions, which are not that favorably received – unlike the Wilson versions, whose first three outings were notably well received, in no small part due to the fact that they were still being written by co-creator Charlier – as indicated by its steadily diminishing popularity; had volume 12 still seen a French-language first-print run of 100.000 copies in 2001, by 2015 that number had dwindled to 40.000 (which is approaching the cut-off point for a standard Francophone comic album being economically viable to become published) when volume 21 was released, aside from the fact that several publishers had foregone the publication of these book titles in their countries altogether.

As already observed by Wilson, the quality of Corteggiani's scenarios kept falling steadily over the years to the point that Swiss comics reporter Erik Svane felt already in 2003 compelled during an interview with the disgraced artist to let slip that "Corteggiani´s scenarios can not hold a candle to those of Charlier", in essence giving voice to what the vast majority of the Blueberry fanbase was already starting to feel by then. A salient detail was, that François Corteggiani had all but disappeared from the public eye by that time; had he still made some rare comic festival appearances at the debut of La solution Pinkerton in 1998–1999, no public appearances have been known since then, and less than half a dozen of very short publicized non-Blueberry interviews. By February 2015, criticism of his Blueberry writings had apparently reached the point at which Corteggiani even felt compelled to take his web-blog offline. Remarkably, Corteggiani had never discussed Young Blueberry even once on his mere five-year old blog.

As of 2019, the spin-off series by Corteggiani and Blanc-Dumont remains only published in French, Spanish, German, Dutch, Danish and Italian, a far cry from the nearly two dozen languages the main series had once been published in, or the by Colin Wilson penciled Young Blueberry volumes for that matter. Additionally, most non-French editions only enjoyed a print-run of no more than 5.000 copies. Worse still, in Croatia and Finland the Blanc-Dumont series only saw a partial one-time-only release before becoming canceled altogether, while Denmark, the Netherlands and Italy did not see any reprint-runs after their initial, small first printings, which is again a far cry from the main, and Wilson series. Ironically, that has made some sold out volumes expensive collectibles in these countries. The Germans and Norwegians (the latter likewise only seeing three individual Blanc-Dumont volumes released, though they added three more volumes into their Egmont omnibus collection version, before quitting the collection in 2010) were fortunate in this regard as those countries saw reprints as part of their 2006 aforementioned Egmont omnibus collections (the Danes had not even bothered to include the Blanc-Dumont series into their version of the Egmont omnibus collection, though they had been very keen to have the Wilson series version included), whereas the Spaniards enjoyed a reprint run in their 2017 "Edición Coleccionista" by Altaya. The only country known to have seen a magazine (pre-)publication of the first few Blanc-Dumont versions was Serbia, which saw a partial series publication between 2015 and 2018 in their monthly  comic magazine. Local publishers in Serbia waived the release into a bonafide album format though.

Coda
In the same year Giraud died, Blanc-Dumont's wife and life-long colorist Claudine also died. Being in addition also confronted with the fast dwindling popularity and continued criticism of his Young Blueberry version, Blanc-Dumont apparently lost all motivation and interest in further creating bande dessinées, and has for all intent and purposes appeared to have retired from the industry entirely. This meant that the conclusion of the intended two-volume Le convoi des bannis story will almost certainly never see the day of light, as Giraud heir Isabelle inherited the right – shared equally with Philippe Charlier – to block the appointment of a new, third artist, a right which she, contrary to her late husband, has continued to exercise to this day. Corteggiani's own death on 21 September 2022 has made the series' continuation even less likely.

In a sense, it was the maligned Colin Wilson who came out on top in the end. Not only have his Young Blueberry albums retained their popularity among fans, particularly the ones written by Charlier (a first-time Polish release of all his Blueberry work in one omnibus collection was published as recent as 2022), he has also managed to rebuild his comics career. Firstly in the US and subsequently in the UK and Italy (where he penciled a successful outing in the Italian Tex Willer series, another legendary European western comic), before coming full circle with a triumphant return on the Franco-Belgian bande dessineé scene which was topped with a successful latter-day western mini-series set in the 1920s, thereby completely thwarting the original intent of his erstwhile friend Corteggiani, who himself was rapidly fading into oblivion after 2015. That 2019–2021 series, Nevada, saw a partial return to the detailed meticulous art style Wilson had employed for his Young Blueberry work. Furthermore, when Wilson started to tour the comic-con and comic festival circuit again in the late-2000s, he quickly found out that the art he created for fans at album/comic book signing sessions (called "dédicases" in French) was in high demand and that of Blueberry in particular, especially when created in his best possible meticulously detailed Giraud-like dynamic art style which had made his Young Blueberry so popular with fans to begin with. Wilson continued to do so ever since right up until the present day, and has during signing sessions confided to sympathetic comic book store owners that the Blueberry art he creates on commission basis alone is currently already enough to earn him a decent living. As with the not-for-regular-publication Blueberry art his former mentor Giraud had created on personal title and for his own Moebius Production company, the quite prolific Young Blueberry art Wilson has made since then in like fashion, remains well outside the legal purview of Dargaud – which is clearly regulated in EU copyright law, where, contrary to the US, it is stipulated that the rights of artists are prevalent over those of publishers. Blanc-Dumont's similar art on the other hand, is shunned by Blueberry fans as a cursory glance on eBay (France) teaches the observer; owners of such art find that they can not even give away their possessions – though typically, this has not applied to his Cartland art, which has remained current to an extent.

Intermezzo: Marshal Blueberry

This spin-off series was the second attempt, this time by Alpen Publishers, to further capitalize on the huge popularity both the main, and Wilson's Blueberry series enjoyed at the time. Written by co-creator Giraud, the series was set around the events depicted in The Lost Dutchman's Mine and dealt with scrupulous gun runners arming Apaches, thereby instigating an uprising. Giraud, who had just permanently returned from his extended stay in the US, was in effect still mourning the passing of Charlier and could not yet bring himself to embark on the art for Blueberry again, but wanted to pay homage to the legacy of his long-time writing partner by creating a story in his spirit, or as Giraud had put it: "[A]nd [I] said to myself: Well, I'm going to see if I'm able to write a story à la Charlier. So I wrote this scenario, not too bad, but quite traditional, quite classic".

Chosen by the publisher for the art work was William Vance, an accomplished Belgian comic artist in his own right and renowned for his XIII comic series. Vance, with whom Giraud had virtually no dealings in person before, drew the first two outings in the series which were colored by his life-long colaborist and wife , but declined afterwards to continue, partly because he was required to finish an album in only four months (in Europe, one year was the typical mean to complete a comic book of 48 pages, but not rarely exceeds this time span in recent decades) and that he was unaccustomed to Giraud's style as script writer. Additionally, even though the first book sold 100.000 copies (while respectable, relatively modest compared to the contemporary print runs of the two other series, they being printed in numbers at the very least double that,) fans received the book with mixed feelings as Vance's style was a too radical departure to their tastes from that of Giraud. This actually was part of the reasons why Wilson's work for Young Blueberry was so favorably received and partly the reason why Blanc-Dumont's was not. While conceding that he found Vance's particular style "seductive but sometimes artificial" – having been pleased with the first album, but less so with the second – Giraud himself was disappointed and hurt by the defection of a professional like the established Vance for reasons of aesthetics and integrity, as he wanted the series to be executed by one artist only, deeming the defection "disastrous" for the series.

Jean Giraud and William Vance, page layout by René Follet
 1: Sur ordre de Washington (Alpen Publishers, 1991/11)
 2: Mission Sherman (Alpen Publishers, 1993/06, no first printing ISBN issued)

Change of artist (II)
After Vance had thrown in the towel, the unresolved story cycle lingered in limbo for a further seven years, before Giraud in person finally found Michel Rouge – whose style was closer to his – willing to finish the cycle. For Rouge, Giraud modified his writing style by providing him with detailed page-layout sketches complete with dialog, which were quite faithfully adhered to by the artist. That Rouge's style resembled that of Giraud, was hardly a surprise, as Rouge was actually not a stranger to Blueberry. Twenty years earlier, when Rouge was still a quite unknown and aspiring comic artist, Giraud took him on as an apprentice and had him ink pages 15–35 of "La longue marche" in 1980 – thereby doing for an aspiring artist what Jijé had done for him nearly two decades before that. At the time it gave rise to the rumor that Giraud was planning to abandon his co-creation and that Rouge was groomed to take over the series. Though a rumor, there was a nuanced morsel of truth in it, as Rouge clarified two decades later: "No, he did not want to abandon Blueberry, but rather sought support and perhaps the opportunity to create books, like the ones he is currently doing [Mister Blueberry]. At the time, he was already playing with the notion of doing parallel series". Rouge's words notwithstanding though, and while he has never acted upon it in earnest, Giraud did later admit that there were "temptations" in that period of time. Though not Blueberry, Rouge himself did take over that other famed contemporary Franco-Belgian western comic series, Hermann's Comanche, but Rouge was not able to regain the popularity that series once enjoyed, when it was still penciled by Hermann, and the series was suspended indefinitely after Rouge had only added five titles to the series.

Jean Giraud and 
 3: Frontière sanglante (Dargaud, 2000/06)

Originally intended to become a full-fledged series, the three Marshal Blueberry titles have remained the only outings in the series, though they too have seen several foreign language publications. Although not in France itself, several European countries have seen serialized magazine pre-publication of the first two titles. The third 2000 title though, was invariably directly released in book format for virtually all countries. No (formal) English language editions were released5. Incidentally, in 2013 Giraud returned the favor Vance had provided for his co-creation, when he took on the art work of volume 18 for his XIII series, and which has seen English translations.

Despite Giraud's original intention to pay homage to his late co-worker, the series did not sit well with Charlier's heir, son Philippe. Citing his concerns for readers becoming confused by the addition of a third series taking place at a different point in time, he stated nine months after Giraud's death, "Thank God, Marshal was nothing more than a triptych. But some readers got a little lost by it." Considering his deep loathing of the deceased Giraud by then (see above and below), Philippe Charlier's ostensible "concern for the readers" appeared duplicitous at least, as he on the very same occasion advocated the inception of a plethora of spin-off series based on the secondary Blueberry characters.

Sequel: Blueberry 1900

A third spin-off series, coined Blueberry 1900, was conceived by original creator Giraud in as early as 1993, intended as a bonafide sequel series. Set, as the series title already implied, in the era of the William McKinley presidency, it would not only have featured a 57-year old Blueberry, but his adult son as well, albeit in a minor role. The story line, intended to encompass five books, was to take place around events surrounding the assassination of President McKinley. Pegged for the artwork was French comic artist François Boucq whom Giraud had met at a comic event in honor of his lifelong friend Jean-Claude Mézières, and concurrently discussed the project with. Actually, Giraud had previously approached Michel Blanc-Dumont, whose "lyric" art work for Jonathan Cartland he adored, for the project in 1993, then still tentatively called Blueberry 20 ans après (Blueberry, 20 years later). Blanc-Dumont, despite being reciprocally an admirer of Giraud's art and aside from being still invested in his own Western comic, thought the project not suitable for him, deeming the script outline too Mœbiusienne for his taste, and had already suggested Boucq instead. Boucq showed interest and was enthusiastic about the project, and indeed embarked on the production of pre-publication art studies, but deemed a cycle of five books too much, managing to negotiate it down to a cycle of three books.

However, Philippe Charlier, son of the late Jean-Michel Charlier and proprietor of "JMC Aventures" – the foundation and legal copyright owner, set up back in 1990 with the specific intent to safeguard the creative integrity and legacy of his father, both in a spiritual as well as a commercial sense, but which had become dormant after the failed experiment at Alpen Publishers – was nowhere near as enthusiastic as Boucq was. He became increasingly alarmed and downright aghast when reading commentaries, Giraud made in contemporary magazine interviews, clarifying his intentions and premises for the proposed series of a Blueberry residing with the Hopi tribe, meditating under the influence of mind-expanding substances, while President McKinley was levitating in the White House due to a Hopi spell. As heir and steward of his father's co-creations and legacy, being the 50% co-owner of the Blueberry brand, he still had the unequivocal right to veto any and all proposals regarding the trademark Blueberry and did not hesitate for a moment to exercise his prerogative in this case, going as far as threatening Giraud with a lawsuit, resulting in that the project fell through. As per a horrified Charlier Jr. in a contemporary statement: "The script is unbelievably horrifying. It is an effrontery, constructed out of implausible circumstances. Like in the new [OK Corral] story cycle, we find a totally passive Blueberry, only meditating, while the president, enchanted by Indians, is levitating in the White House". As he indicated, though he had given his seal of approval in this case, Charlier Jr., also became wary and disapproving of Giraud depicting the former lieutenant as a passive loafer in the OK Corral story arc, only aggravated from his point of view by the fact that Giraud could not refrain himself from including some elements from Native-American mysticism in "OK Corral" and "Dust" – though not anywhere near as extensive as he had apparently intended for Blueberry 1900.

Philippe Charlier, conservative by nature like his father, had, unlike his father, no patience whatsoever with Giraud's "New Age" predilections (also serving as an additional rationale for his decision to proceed with Alpen Publishers back in 1990, instead of Les Humanoïdes Associés, renowned for its catalog of more adult, "esoteric" comics, like those of Boucq and Alejandro Jodorowsky), particularly for his admitted fondness for mind-expanding substances. It was he (after his father's death), who testified in a deposition, that his father had always "detested" Giraud's work as "Mœbius" and that he considered that work as "treason", after which Giraud – known for his lifelong aversion to any kind of legal proceedings – backed down. While Philippe was unable to stop the OK Corral cycle, because of the "longest living survivor" main series covenant Giraud and Charlier Sr. had signed, he was legally able to stop Giraud in his tracks for Blueberry 1900 because it had never been presented by Giraud as a main series effort, but rather as a brand expansion (notice the legal difference), and on this Charlier Jr. had veto rights.14 Reinforced by the for him favorable court ruling, Charlier Jr. was therefore subsequently able to veto Giraud's 1999 scenario outline for a Fort Mescalero movie, which was to feature Blueberry in extensive substance-induced hallucinatory scenes, besides Giraud's intention to have the Jim Cutlass series merge with the Blueberry main series, due to the fact that later volumes of that series also increasingly incorporated likewise scenes, arguing that such a merging would indeed constitute another brand extension.

How far Giraud actually already was in his thinking was exemplified by the inclusion of his art featuring Blueberry with Hopi tribesmen, endowed with the caption "In Hopi Towns", as the interior flyleaf illustration for the regular 1990 "Arizona Love" French book release, reprinted as such, without the caption, in the last 1991 Graphitti Designs release, Moebius #9. Additionally, Giraud had sneaked in some Blueberry 1900 elements (including floating Washington dignitaries) in the non-Blueberry, Native-American themed, short story "The Words of Chief Seattle", which saw English publication in Epic's second Blueberry book release, "Ballad for a Coffin".

Giraud's fascination with shamanism went even further back than that, when he was introduced by Jodorowsky – during the failed Dune-project – in 1974 to the writings of Carlos Castaneda, who had written a series of books that describe his training in shamanism, particularly with a group whose lineage descended from the Toltecs. The books, narrated in the first person, related his experiences under the tutelage of a Yaqui "Man of Knowledge" named Don Juan Matus. Castaneda's writings made a deep and everlasting impression on Giraud, already open to Native-Mexican folk culture due to his three previous extended trips to the country (he had visited the country a third time in 1972, also see Giraud on Carlos Castaneda), and it did influence his art as "Mœbius", particularly in regard to dream sequences, though he was not quite able to work in such influences in his mainstream Blueberry comic. Yet, unbeknownst to writer Charlier, he did already sneak in some Castaneda elements in "Nez Cassé". Castaneda's influence reasserted itself in full in Giraud's later life, having worked in elements more openly after Charlier's death in "Geronimo l'Apache", becoming, as indicated, a major element for Blueberry 1900.

Ramifications
Boucq was disappointed with the project falling through, disagreeing with Charlier Jr.'s assessment: "Quite the contrary, depicting him as an old man, forced us to endow him with a special kind of dignity". Yet, for him it turned out to be a blessing in disguise eventually, as it became an inspiration for Jodorowsky (co-creator of Giraud's acclaimed Incal series, and already a frequent Boucq collaborator), to co-create with him their own acclaimed western comic, . Even the fictional "Fort Mescalero" has resurfaced as Blueberry's first Far West posting in the 2007 prequel book Apaches, aside from the fact that much of what he had envisioned for this project actually turned up in the 2004 Blueberry movie. As a warming-up for Blueberry 1900, Boucq and Giraud had already collaborated on a Native-American themed project when they both contributed to the 1995 "Laissé Pour Mort", a to 500 pieces limited CD/Portfolio release from Parisian-based publisher Stardom, Giraud's own publishing house/art gallery, ran at the time by his second wife Isabelle. Later, in 2008, Giraud submitted a "Blueberry-meets-Bouncer" contribution to the 250-piece limited "Bouncer" art portfolio from short-lived publisher Osidarta, aside from providing a foreword.

Despite Charlier Jr.'s vehement resistance, Giraud himself seemed to have never abandoned the notion of doing Blueberry 1900 as was evidenced in a 2008 interview, when he was asked if he would ever return to Blueberry after he had once stated in a prior magazine interview that he was done with his creation upon the conclusion of the OK Corral story arc. Giraud's answer was: "Looking back at it, I realized that I really wanted to continue Blueberry. This would probably not be the case if I were to re-start a cycle of 5 albums, because I do not think I have the energy left for another ten years of work. Actually, I want to take up the idea of Blueberry 1900 again, which has a very realistic side, sometimes a more crazy one: the Indians were a magical people, that was part of their culture, and I want to stage the collision between our world, through the conquest of the West, and the world of Indians who resist. It is often shown how events took place in a strategic sense, but I wish to plunge into Indian sociology, like it was done in Dances with Wolves, by replacing our materialistic vision of the world, and by explaining the clash of cultures that took place. Of course, there is a certain challenge in doing the story this way, because I might possibly yank the rug from under the feet of the reader. I still have to rework the script and do the page divisions, but I think it will take between 100 and 200 pages". Giraud's death in 2012 ended all notions of a Blueberry 1900 installment, and quite possibly any further installment of the main series as well.

In December 2012, nine months after Giraud's death, a lengthy interview with Philippe Charlier was published in the French comics journal . In it, Charlier Jr., taking considerable care not to speak out of turn for the Giraud heirs, laid out his vision for the future of the Blueberry series. He explained that he saw no reason why of all his father's creations, Blueberry should be the only one left without a future, and that if the main series was to be continued (which he fully expected) he would only sign off on Young Blueberry artist Michel Blanc-Dumont as the main artist. He justified that choice by claiming that he had been the late Giraud's favorite as well – Charlier Jr. was apparently unaware that Giraud had over the years become increasingly disenchanted with the quality of Blanc-Dumont's art, which he had previously admired. (see above). Furthermore, Charlier Jr. fully advocated the launch of multiple spin-off productions based on the secondary characters introduced in the two Blueberry series (Charlier Jr. did not consider Marshal Blueberry as part of Blueberry canon), to be created by artists of his own choosing. When checking in over the telephone with both publisher Dargaud and Giraud's widow Isabelle on a potential main series continuation, Casemate editors received an irked "far too soon to be even discussed" reply from Dargaud, and a very terse and curt "A continuation? Why not." reply from the still grieving Isabelle Giraud.

Philippe Charlier's grandiose vision of a large, lucrative Blueberry-franchise came to naught however, for two reasons. Firstly, as already related above, Blanc-Dumont had all but retired from the bande dessinée industry in 2015, which was in part due to the commercial failure of his Young Blueberry version in the end. Secondly, and more pertinently, Charlier Jr. discovered that an equally shared veto right is a double-edged sword, as heir Isabelle Giraud turned out every bit as protective, aggressively so, of her late husband's artistic and commercial legacy as Philippe Charlier has ever been of his father's. Having had had a ringside view, Isabelle Giraud had witnessed firsthand the frustrations and aggravation Charlier Jr. had caused her husband in the last decade-and-a-half of his life, as related in the below-listed 2015 Numa Sadoul biography, and has until 2019 not approved a single Blueberry publication project beyond the 2012 Intégrale omnibus collection, let alone a continuation of the main series, or a new artist for the Young Blueberry series – in stark contrast to her late husband's work signed as "Mœbius". Like Jijé's widow before her, Isabelle Giraud had no intention whatsoever to let Philippe Charlier profit from her late husband's body of work.

The Blueberry biography

In 1974 Charlier had a sixteen-page background article added to "Ballade pour un cercueil", when the book was first released. The article concerned a fictitious biography of Mike Steve Donovan, alias Mike S. Blueberry, detailing his life from birth to death, and written from a historic, journalistic point of view. When asked about it a decade later, Charlier clarified that once it became clear to him that Blueberry had become the central character of the series he had conceived, he then already postulated in his mind the broad strokes of the complete life and works of his creation, including the reasons for Blueberry's broken nose and odd alias. By the time "Ballade pour un cercueil" was ready for its book release, Charlier deemed the moment had arrived to entrust his musings to paper. There had been a practical reason as well for this. The story already ran 16 pages over-length and as contemporary printers printed eight double-sided comic book pages on one sheet of print paper, the addition of the 16-page biography was not that much of a bother for their production process. "Ballade pour un cercueil" therefore became one of the first Franco-Belgium comic albums to break the mold of the hitherto standard 48-page count format.

Currently somewhat of a staple in European comics, at that time the inclusion of an informative background section in a comic book of that size and wealth of detail was hitherto unheard of and a complete novelty, and what Charlier had not foreseen was that many in the pre-internet era mistook the biography for real, factual history, propagating it as such in other outside media as well. Charlier, who also was an investigative journalist and a documentary maker with a solid reputation for thorough documentation, had previously already written several, shorter historical Old West background editorials for the 1969-1970 Super Pocket Pilote series (issues 4–9) as companion pieces for the Jeunesse de Blueberry shorts, which were historically accurate – and, incidentally, working much of the material contained therein, especially the photographs, into the biography for the post-war era – and readers of the pre-internet-era therefore assumed that the biography was likewise.

Still, having written the biography within the historical context as postulated in the comic, fully expecting his readership to understand it as such, Charlier originally had not the intention to perform a prank at the expense of his readers, despite him later presenting it as such in the above statement, mischievously poking fun at the "respectable" and "eminent", but gullible, believers – and which was in concordance with biographer Ratier's observation of the author "taking liberties" with actual events for dramatic effect. His "it was meant to" statement actually implied his original intent on top of the incongruous circumstance that he had already left the employ of Dargaud and Pilote in 1972 as already mentioned. A baffled Charlier had declared on a prior occasion: "I have written a fictitious biography on Blueberry, accompanied by photographs found in American archives, and the whole world went for it!", having already stated on an even earlier occasion: "To this very day, because of "Ballade pour un cercueil" in which we gave Blueberry with a photographs illuminated biography, I still receive letters from readers – not from kids mind you, but from grownups – asking how on Earth we have managed to track down the real Blueberry. There are people who take it as real fact". The photos were indeed authentic, though their captions were not. To complete the appearance of a bonafide in-universe biography, a Civil War-era style group portrait, featuring Blueberry and flanked by the by Charlier mentioned comic artists, was included, ostensibly recently discovered and from the hand of American artist Peter Glay, but in reality created by Pierre Tabary under the pseudonym. Tabary, brother of Jean, was a French book illustrator of some renown himself, also working for Pilote as illustrator for their magazine editorials at the time. Incidentally, a salient detail was that events, as related in the biography, in Blueberry's life directly upon war's end, but before he arrived in the Far West, eventually became those of Jim Cutlass, the other Giraud/Charlier western.

J.M. Lofficier has translated the biography in English, specifically for inclusion in the Graphitti Designs anthology collection (it was not featured in the Epic editions), published in the fourth volume of the collection, Moebius #4. Lofficier however, took it upon himself to slightly edit Charlier's original text in order to reflect Blueberry's life as featured in the post-1974 publications (despite being reprinted numerous times, not only in French but in other languages as well, Charlier himself has never revisited his original text again), and as such it is not an entirely faithful translation as some elements were added, whereas some others were omitted, such as the aforementioned notion of Blueberry ultimately heading a unit of Apache scouts.

Legacy

Second tier Blueberry-related spin-off series
These concern spin-off creations that have very strong ties with the Blueberry series, but which differ in this respect from the aforementioned sub-series that neither Blueberry himself, nor any of the major secondary characters, appear in these creations.

Jim Cutlass

Even though neither Blueberry nor any of the major secondary characters of the main series has made an appearance, or are referenced to, in this bande dessinée series, Jim Cutlass is of all the second-tier spin-off series the one that is most inextricably associated with the main series, even more so than all the hereafter mentioned productions – and arguably even more so than the Marshal Blueberry mini-series for its complete lack of Jean-Michel Charlier involvement. In effect, the Jim Cutlass series exclusively owes its very existence to the Blueberry main series.

It was actually the 1974-1979 Blueberry royalties conflict that lay at the very heart of the Jim Cutlass series origin history. Two years after the conflict had started and in which Georges Dargaud had stubbornly refused to budge, he, acting like it was business as usual, brazenly asked Charlier for a Blueberry short story for a Western special he had planned as a June 1976 side publication of Pilote magazine. Charlier however, had no intention whatsoever to add yet another Blueberry title to a body of work that was already under contention, and found, as expected, his co-creator Giraud in full agreement. "The Blueberry magazine rights, " Giraud had declared, "were a year before I embarked on Jim Cutlass the subject of a dispute between the Pilote people and I. When they afterwards asked me for my contribution to a western special issue of Pilote, the relationships had somewhat improved, but I was dead-set on not wanting Blueberry to appear in Pilote ever again. We were already in negotiations with other magazines for that bande dessinée. It was therefore essentially a copyright issue that made Charlier and I invent another western hero." The primary reason for both creators to give in to Dargaud's request after all with a western short story, can only be construed as a token of goodwill of not wanting to shut the door on their parent publisher permanently, thereby leaving some wriggling room for future negotiations. As implied by Giraud however, Charlier took great care that the story copyrights were covered by his EdiFrance/EdiPresse syndicate agency's magazine exemption clause – he had already reactivated two years earlier to have "Angel Face" appear in Nouveau Tintin instead of Pilote –, meaning that the two creators retained full ownership of their new creation, and not publisher Dargaud where its Blueberry ownership had been the very root cause of the conflict in the first place.

As intended, the 17-page short story, entitled "Mississippi River", appeared in the "Special Wéstern" companion issue of Pilote number 25 of June 1976, which had by then become a monthly magazine. At that time still lacking a series title, as it was originally intended as a one-off publication, the story involved a northerner who very shortly before the outbreak of the Civil War travels to New Orleans, Louisiana in order to claim his inheritance, a plantation. On his way, he meets several firebrand southern secessionists and as a decided abolitionist runs into serious troubles with several of them after helping a slave escape. For "Mississippi River" Giraud used the very same, what Charlier had coined "less convoluted", art style he had already used for his Young Blueberry short stories as created for Super Pocket Pilote eight years earlier, even though the plates for the "Special Wéstern" issue were twice the size of those of Super Pocket Pilote.

Three years later, the Blueberry royalties conflict had flared up again in full force, and Jim Cutlass found himself quite unexpectedly smack in the middle of the conflict, front and center. Charlier and Giraud had decided to turn up the pressure on publisher Dargaud by having the long and eagerly awaited "Broken Nose" Blueberry outing pre-published in Métal Hurlant magazine instead of Pilote. In addition, they had decided to revisit their 1976 short story and expand it into a full-blown 60-page story, and have it pre-published in Métal Hurlant magazine a short while later as well, in order to make it crystal clear to publisher Dargaud that the Blueberry creators had options. In an effort to turn up the heat on Dargaud even further, the album was already released by the by Giraud co-founded publisher Les Humanoïdes Associés before the pre-publication in Métal Hurlant had even run its course, and before Dargaud had the chance to release the "Broken Nose" album. As already related, the pressure had no effect on Dargaud and the Blueberry creators left their parent publisher – definitively in Charlier's case, as it turned out – for greener pastures elsewhere. Incidentally, neither "Broken Nose" nor "Mississippi River" saw publication in Heavy Metal though, the US counterpart of Métal Hurlant.

The original short story was either by coincidence or by design written by Charlier as an open-ended story, which made it suitable to expand into a full-blown history. The story picks up after the original short – which was republished completely unaltered – with Cutlass returning to Louisiana right after the war in which he had served as a Union lieutenant, to find his inheritance in a dilapidated state, only inhabited by his cousin Carolyn Grayson, his co-inheritor of the plantation, who had suffered greatly at the hands of Union marauders during the war. In his efforts to revitalize the plantation, Cutlass has to deal with all the woes that had befallen the South directly upon war's end, carpet baggers, marauding ex-slaves, the KKK, looting deserters from both armies, as well as the surviving enemies he had made just before the war, only to be embezzled out of his inheritance in the end by his cousin Carolyn, after which he has no other choice but to return to the army. Charlier was inspired in part by the 1939 classic movie Gone with the Wind, but mostly by his own Blueberry biography he had written five years earlier, as all immediate post-war events that befell Cutlass he had originally envisioned to be those of Blueberry himself. Though like Blueberry an anti-hero, Charlier took care to make the ginger-headed Cutlass as different as possible, making him in essence a deeply flawed self-serving loser, completely unencumbered by Blueberry's sense of morality and justice. In addition, none of Cutlass's plans seemed to work out as he also lacked his colleague's on his feet thinking in tight spots, only prevailing through blind luck.

Realizing full well that the publication of the expanded story was time sensitive in order to have it out before the "Broken Nose" album release, Giraud was forced to produce the art at a breakneck pace, one page a day. To do so, he was forced to create his art in a seemingly even less "convoluted" manner than he already had employed for the original short. He stated in 1982, " Well, that comic needed an adapted drawing technique. I had to produce one page a day!! If you have to work at such speed, great detailing goes out the window and you can not reason out everything beforehand. Spontaneity and clarity are all-important in this story." Even though there is a difference of day and night between the art of this story and "Broken Nose", considerable thought did go into page layout and readability to make the story easily accessible, even more so than the very "convoluted"  "Broken Nose" in which the meticulously detailed "Mœbius" artwork style had made its appearance.

Fans were totally taken by surprise by the unexpected publication of Jim Cutlass, but also puzzled why it was created in the first place. Not privy to the behind-the-scenes going-ons at Dargaud, an incorrect, by French comics critic Jean-Pierre Mercier initiated, rumor started to make the rounds that both Métal Hurlant publisher Les Humanoïdes Associés and Giraud were in desperate need of a financial injection, and that a western "quickie" by Giraud was the only way to get it. While Mercier was right in his assessment of the publisher's financial difficulties at that time, he was completely led astray by a flippant and prosaic statement Giraud had made around the same time he had made his "copyright issue" statement above. He then concurrently stated in another interview, "I started with Jim Cutlass because I needed the money to pay for the furnishing of my new house." Incidentally, Giraud had made a similar flippant remark in regard to "Broken Nose".

Still, Blueberry fans, pleased with another Giraud  western, took to the Jim Cutlass publication with a fervor, and the album did quite well in sales. Over time, it eventually saw almost as many foreign language translations as any outing of the Blueberry main series had, which included one in English. However, since the album failed in its primary objective, i.e. move Dargaud into the creators' desired direction, the creators deemed it no longer worthwhile to pursue the series any further.

Because of its failure as a means of pressure, "Mississippi River" remained an one-shot publication for little over a decade. However, Jean-Michel Charlier had been busy since 1987 to revive most of his older comic creations for intended publication in a new, yet to be launched comics magazine, beyond the ones he had already revived/created for Koralle/Novedi, explaining the pile of scripts Giraud saw on Charlier's desk when he visited him six months before his death. One of these older creations Charlier had intended to revive, was Jim Cutlass. Acutely aware that Giraud had his plate full with not only Blueberry, but also his various "Mœbius" endeavors, which included The Incal series, Charlier went in search for a replacement artist for the series, which he initially thought to have found in the Italian artist Gaetano Liberatore, who at that time was riding high on his anarchistic RanXerox comic. An arranged meeting with French artist  though, eventually made Charlier decide to select him as the new Jim Cutlass artist.

Giraud was not entirely left out the loop as it was his own publishing house Aedena, he had co-founded in 1984, where Charlier with the Aedena founders had planned to launch the comics magazine Hugh!, in which his revived comic series were to be published, Jim Cutlass among them. And it explained the trial run "Rossi: Jim Cutlass" art mini-portfolio Annestay was referring to in the quote box above at Aedena, which thereby became one of the very last releases of that publisher in 1987. The for Charlier inconvenient Aedena bankruptcy also served as a rationale why he subsequently approached Fabrice Giger in 1988 – behind Giraud's back this time – who ironically, had just bought Les Humanoïdes Associés, the very same Humanos Jim Cutlass was intended to be taken away from.

When Annestay eventually called Rossi to offer him the Jim Cutlass series, he "(...)needed about a quarter of a second to think it through, and say yes immediately". He was motivated to do so because, "[t]here was only one Cutlass album, but mostly because it was not Blueberry. I have always loved the Cutlass character in a hot and intimate manner, because he is so full of temperament and passion, because he has a pathos that is less apparent in Blueberry. And because I loved the loose art style. And in this roundabout manner I was able to meet Jean - professionally." Rossi incidentally, was no stranger to offbeat western comics, as he had already created his own 1982-1987 Chariot de Thepsis series which ran for four volumes before he, due to the mediocre measure of commercial success, decided to drop it in order to take on Jim Cutlass.

Shortly before Charlier's death, he was persuaded by Rossi to select Casterman as the publisher of the revived Cutlass series. "It was I who pushed Jean-Michel Charlier to go with Casterman! Jean Annestay found himself at Casterman after the bankruptcy of Aedena. The Hugh! magazine project did not see the light of day and Jean-Michel wanted to stop with Novedi. He no longer wanted to go with Dargaud but he had a contract offer with Alpen. I didn't know this publisher, the future Humanoïdes Associés [sic.], and we negotiated with the Casterman people; It went very well and we ended up with this completely atypical comic strip in their monthly  magazine, like Julius [note: a contemporary Rossi non-western comic series] had been in L’echo des savannes! But they liked it, did a little promotion and believed in it! This is how Cutlass escaped this intention of Fabrice Giger and Humanos to lay claim on all the Charlier material." Despite his very advanced negotiations with Giger, Charlier conceded in this particular case, because of his staunch conviction that bande dessinées were first and foremost magazine publications, which Alpen had not in place – nor would they ever have.

Charlier's death on 10 July 1989 delayed the debut at Casterman of the second Jim Cutlass outing. At the time of his death, Charlier's scenario, he had endowed with the working title "K.K.K.", was finished up until and including page 36, after which it was up to Giraud to finish it, much like he had to do with "Arizona Love". Actually, Rossi wrote a story synopsis for the remaining pages 37–64 and asked Charlier's widow if he could proceed. After gaining her permission, he sought out Giraud for further advise and was given four pages with detailed dialog and scenario notes after which Rossi was able to rearrange the preliminary page layouts into the final ones. The freedom he got from Giraud became the template for their future cooperation together. Neither were the negotiations with Casterman finalized yet, and Giraud in particular made use of the opportunity to hammer out a very advantageous deal for himself. He secured a compensation of 5,000 FF (roughly US$587 in 1989 prices) per page and an increase of his album royalties to 13%, which was double the then-going industry rate. He was able to do this by playing off Giger's Humanoïdes Associés and Casterman against each other, demonstrating he had learned well from his late writing partner, but arguably also allowing his displeasure at Charlier's surreptitious negotiations with Giger to vent.

After the completion of the last 30 pages, the by Giraud to "L'Homme de la Nouvelle-Orleans" ("The Man from New-Orleans") re-titled story, started its belated serialized pre-publication in (À suivre)s July 1990 issue no. 150, accompanied by a proudly written two-page editorial (pp. 45–46).

Jean-Michel Charlier/Jean Giraud and 
2: L'Homme de la Nouvelle-Orleans (Casterman, 1991/01)

The publication of (À suivre) was terminated by Casterman in 1997, which also meant the termination of the Jim Cutlass serialized magazine pre-publication. The last two series outings were therefore released directly in album format. As explored above Giraud had intended to incorporate Blueberry into the Jim Cutlass series, but this was met by an immediate veto by Charlier heir Philippe because he abhorred Giraud's "New Age" predilections; in the later volumes of the series voodoo elements, dream sequences, and Afro-American sorcery started to play an ever increasing role in the story lines. And while Philippe Charlier was unable to veto the series proper as it too fell under the Blueberry "longest survivor contracts" Giraud had signed with his father, he was entitled to veto any "brand extension" that did not meet with his approval. And even though it did enjoy a certain following, being in some countries reprinted to this day, the series – its last two volumes particularly – was unable to achieve anything near the commercial success of the series that had spawned it, and the two artists decided to threw in the towel after volume 7 was released in 1999, leaving the original creators' debut album the series' most popular and successful one.

Jean Giraud and Christain Rossi
3:  L'alligator blanc (Casterman, 1993/09)
4: Tonnerre au Sud (Casterman, 1995/01)
5: Jusqu'au cou ! (Casterman, 1997/08)
6: Colts, Fantômes et Zombies (Casterman, 1998/10)
7: Nuit noire (Casterman, 1999/09)

It has not hurt Rossi's comics career however, as he did create several successful series afterwards, including his latter-day W.E.S.T western, which featured supernatural overtones.

Die Frau mit dem Silberstern
This German-language comic, which translates as "The Woman with the Silver Star", created in its entirety by German comics artist Martin Frei and which debuted in September 2021, concerned a sequel to "The Man with the Silver Star" and revolves around the later adventures of the two major protagonistic secondary characters introduced in that outing, the teacher Katie March – the German series' titular "Frau", or "Woman" – and the former deputy (but now full-fledged) marshal Dusty. Though referenced by name only once, Blueberry does not make any kind of appearance in the intended two-part mini-series. It is unclear however, if Frei had obtained legal permission from the Charlier and Giraud heirs to proceed with his creation. Still, this was actually the kind of creation that came very close to what Philippe Charlier had in mind nine years earlier as part of the by him envisioned grand, overall Blueberry-franchise.
1: Leutnant Blueskull (issues 267, 09/21 - 270, 12/21)

Homage series
At the start of the 2010s, French Bande Dessinée publishers introduced a new concept into their release line-ups, that of the homage, or tribute series. Goal of those series was to give (predominantly) younger and less established artists a chance to apply their own spin to classic BD series, either by art, scenario, or both. These one-story works were explicitly intended as one-off projects encompassing at the very most two volumes only, and were most definitely neither intended as a continuation of a series nor as a spin-off series, and required the express permission of the original creators or their heirs. Even though purist fans consider the phenomenon with much reservations, the new concept took hold and several classic series have in the meantime received what the French call "XYZ [vu] par..." (="XYZ [as seen] by...") treatment. One of the first classic series to see outings in the format had been Valérian and Laureline by Giraud's lifelong friend Jean-Claude Mézières.

Sfar and Blain
In November 2019 Dargaud published a homage book made by the duo Joann Sfar and Christophe Blain, after Isabelle Giraud had unexpectedly given permission to embark on a new Blueberry project for the very first time since her husband's death. As if to underscore the uniqueness of the occasion, the duo was permitted to create a two-volume album story as Blueberrys first homage release. Their two-volume story deals with a by white settlers incited Apache uprising and is set between the albums "Trail of the Navajo" and "The Man with the Silver Star". The first third-party Blueberry interpretation series was launched with much fanfare and has seen several translations – albeit in far less languages that the three origin series –, to wit in German, Spanish and Dutch.
1: Amertume Apache (Dargaud, 11/2019)

Film adaptations
A 2004 film adaptation, Blueberry: L'expérience secrète(U.S. release title is Renegade), was directed by Jan Kounen and starred Vincent Cassel in the lead role, with Giraud himself making a walk-on cameo appearance at the beginning of the movie. Only loosely based on "The Lost Dutchman's Mine"-dyptich, many purist fans were appalled by this film for its prominent depiction of, and reliance on, Native-American mysticism and shamanism, as already hinted at in the film's subtitle. Giraud though, has expressed pride of Kounen's film in the special features of the 2004 French 2-disc "Edition Collector" DVD, which was not that surprising as it closely chimed with what he had envisioned for his own Fort Mescalero movie, and Blueberry 1900 comic projects. Philippe Charlier on the other hand, was livid when he was presented the final product, and demanded his father's credit removed from the film – which did not happen incidentally, as this under French copy right laws would have also entailed him forfeiting his share of the film royalties he had already received. Kounen himself, unperturbed by Charlier Jr's objections, had stated: "My film is a Blueberry album as though it had been drawn by Mœbius". In regard to the fan criticism he commented that "fans are uncreative and aggressive, they want us to serve them, they are a real plague for a filmmaker".

Three prior attempts to bring Blueberry to the silver screen had fallen through two decades earlier; in 1986 Charlier disclosed how American actor Martin Kove had actually already been signed to play the titular role – with whom Kove shared a remarkable resemblance at the time – for the first two early 1980s attempts, which were both based on the "Confederate Gold" cycle. It was Kove who introduced the two Blueberry creators to would-be American film producers on both occasions. The first attempt failed because American producers intended a complete script rewrite turning Blueberry into a completely unrecognizable standard western. The second attempt suffered even worse as its American producer, "inspired" by the success of the 1981 movie Raiders of the Lost Ark, wanted to turn the project into a Raiders 2.0, set in the Yucatán peninsula, complete with Aztec warriors and pyramids and featuring a daring escape in a zeppelin-type airship. Helped by his background in law, an aghast Charlier instructed Giraud to sabotage the project as much as possible and the  Blueberry creators eventually managed to buy back the rights for US$30.000. Already mentioned by Charlier in his 1986 interview, Kove had even traveled to Europe to shoot some test-footage scenes from the comic series in this role in order to entice potential investors, and that some of it was still in his possession as it turned out decades later. Convinced that the project was a viable one, Kove has also revealed in 2014 that he, together with the two Blueberry creators, tried to save it by putting up his own money as well when the project was falling apart due to arguments about funding among European/American would-be producers – to no avail however, which was a slightly different version of events as had been related by Charlier.

The third (and last) attempt concerned a European only endeavor, which had at one point actually involved Sergio Leone, according to Charlier, and was this time around conceived from the outset as a limited television movie series, a format quite popular in Europe (Mediterranean Europe in particular) in the 1980s, and slated to be produced by the Swiss/French/Belgian production/distribution company Technisonor, more faithfully adhering – than the later 2004 film adaptation – to the main comic series and intended to span the "Iron Horse" through the "Rehabilitation" story cycles. That 1983 attempt petered out without so much as a whimper, most likely due to lack of interest on the part of European investors.

Exhibitions
After Giraud had returned to France pursuant his extended stay in the United States, generic interest in his work steadily grew and resulted in an increasing number of latter-day exhibitions at museums and conventions, featuring his original art. Due to his international renown as "Mœbius", virtually all of these exhibitions focused on his work as such, even if Blueberry art was included in some of them. Nonetheless, at least four such exhibitions were known to have been Western/Blueberry specific.
 December 1995: «Wanted: Blueberry» exposition at the Arthaud Grenette bookstore, Grenoble, also featuring original Blueberry art by Colin Wilson. Both he and Jean Giraud attended the opening on 1 December, making themselves also available for book signings. Prior to the opening a promotional leaflet was disseminated by the bookstore ("Arthaud BD News", issue 1, November 1995), featuring a three-page interview with Giraud.
 19 September-9 October 1996: «Jean Giraud Blueberry» exposition at the Stardom Gallery, Paris, for the occasion of the upcoming release of the "Blueberry's" artbook by Stardom – Giraud's own publishing house/art gallery. The below-mentioned 1997 documentary was the registration of events surrounding the release, including the exhibition.
 15 March-15 April 2005: «JEAN GIRAUD: Exposition de dessins et planches originales de "DUST" le nouvel album de Blueberry aux editions Dargaud», Galerie Arludik, Paris, France; small exhibition for the occasion of the 28th Blueberry album release.
 15 January-14 June 2009: «Blueberry» exposition at the Maison de la Bande Dessinée, Brussels

Documentaries
 1988:Jean-Michel Charlier: "un réacteur sous la plume" –  Documentary by Jean-Pierre Delvalle (CNBDI, Angoulême, January, 25 min.). Overview of Charlier's career, with ample attention for Blueberry.
 French SECAM tape release in 1997 as an outing in the Atelier Multimédia, «Portrait d'Auteur» collection.
 1994:Blueberry –  Documentary by Christophe Heili (Cendranes Films for Canal+/TVCF, October, 27 min.)
 1997:Jean [Gir]aud's - Documentary by Hervé Eparvier (Stardom, Paris, 22 min.). Documentary produced on the occasion of the September 1996 Blueberry exposition at Stardom Gallery. The documentary title is a play on the title of the "Blueberry's" artbook, slated for release at the time. Pettigrew's 2000 documentary is modeled after the template set in this documentary.
 French SECAM tape release in 1997, included as bonus for the boxed, limited edition of the artbook "Blueberry's"
 2000:Mister Gir & Mike S. Blueberry –  Documentary by Damian Pettigrew, registering two days in the life of Giraud in October 1999, when he visits his atelier with his family, the offices of Paris publisher Dargaud and the Parisian mega-chain store :fr:Fnac for the launch of the Blueberry album, "Géronimo l'Apache", and when he travels to Saint Malo for its 1999 comic-book festival, on both occasions executing numerous sketches and watercolors for fans. Throughout the registrations, Giraud comments on his co-creation, and is intercut with additional remarks from Thierry Smolderen, Guy Vidal and Cristian Rossi, commenting on the place of Blueberry in the Franco-Belgian comic world and in (French) culture in general. In the film's last sequence, Giraud does a spontaneous life-size portrait in real time of Geronimo on a large sheet of glass (Musée de la Bande dessinée d'Angoulême, 55 min.)
 French SECAM tape release in 2000
 French 1-disc DVD release in 2011, as an augment to Pettigrew's 2010 Métamœbius documentary.
 2007:Mœbius Redux: A Life in Pictures – Biographical documentary by Hasko Baumann (Germany, England, Finland, Netherlands: Arte, BBC, ZDF, YLE, AVRO, 68 min.) Though most of this documentary is taken up by his work as "Mœbius", ample attention is also given to his Blueberry creation.
 Non-commercial, but licensed, Australian 1-disc DVD release in 2008
 Commercial German 2-disc DVD release in 2010, extended to 190 min.

Awards
The series has received (world) wide recognition in the comics community, and the chief factor for Giraud receiving his first recorded international award in 1972. Listed are only those rewards, the author(s) received specifically for Blueberry, as Giraud in particular received an additional multitude of awards and nominations for his work as "Mœbius" from 1977 onward, including awards encompassing his entire body of works.
1969 & 1970: Prix Phénix Paris, for Lieutenant Blueberry in the category "La Meilleure Serie d'Aventures".
1972: Special Award, from the National Cartoonists Society for Lieutenant Blueberry as "Best Realistic Artist", Giraud only.
1973: Shazam Award of the Academy of Comic Book Arts for Lieutenant Blueberry: "L'homme qui valait 500 000 $" in the category "Best Foreign Comic Series".
1973: Prix Phénix, Paris, for among others Blueberry in the category "Scenario d'Aventures", Charlier only.
1975: Yellow Kid Salon Award, Lucca, in the category "Best Foreign Artist", Giraud only.
1978: Goldene Sprechblase Award of the Vereinigung für Comic-Literatur for Leutnant Blueberry in the category "Besondere Verdienste um die Comic-Literatur", Giraud only.
1979: Adamson Award in the category "Best International Comic-Strip [or comic book] Cartoonist", Giraud only.
 1985: Angoulême International Comics Festival Grand Prix for the graphic arts, Giraud only.
1991: Harvey Award for the Blueberry saga published by Epic, in the category "Best American Edition of Foreign Material".
1996:  Soleil d'Or of the Festival BD de Solliès-Ville for Blueberry: "Mister Blueberry", in the category "Best Comic Album", Giraud only. (Award statue sculpted by François Boucq, the intended Blueberry 1900 artist)
1997: Eisner Award nomination for The Blueberry Saga #1: The Confederate Gold published by Mojo Press, in the category "Best Archival Collection".
 2000: Sproing Award for Blueberry: "Geronimo" in the category "Best Translated Strips", Giraud only.
While Giraud has garnered universal praise and acclaim for his work as "Moebius", Blueberry has always remained his most successful and most recognized work in mainland Europe, despite its artist developing somewhat of a love/hate relationship with his co-creation in later life, which was exemplified by him regularly taking an extended leave of absence from his co-creation. That Blueberry has always remained his primary source of income, allowing him to fully indulge in his artistic endeavors as Moebius, was admitted as such by Giraud as early as 1979: "If an album of Moebius is released, about 10.000 people are interested. A Blueberry album sells at least 100.000 copies [in France]", and as late as 2005, "Blueberry is in some ways the "sponsor" of Moebius, for years now".

Notes and references

Sources

; theme issue

; the vast majority of the featured artist's interviews, conducted by Svane, was originally published in French in the Swiss comics journal Swof, Hors-Séries (Moebius-themed) issue 2, 2000/Q1, but were updated and augmented with material edited out in the original publication, as well as enhanced with material from other, older source publications, especially opportune in the latter case for the by then deceased Jean-Michel Charlier.

; biography

External links
Blueberry official site  
Blueberry on Jean-Michel Charlier's website 
Fort Navajo and Blueberry publications in Pilote BDoubliées 

1963 comics debuts
2012 comics endings
Belgian comics adapted into films
Comics adapted into video games
Comics by Jean Giraud
Comics spin-offs
Dargaud titles
Drama comics
Epic Comics titles
French comics adapted into films
French comic strips
Pilote titles
Western (genre) comics